= List of AMD graphics processing units =

The following is a list that contains general information about GPUs, and other video cards, made by AMD, including those made by ATI Technologies before 2006, based on official specifications in table-form.

== Field explanations ==
The headers in the table listed below describe the following:

- Model – The marketing name for the GPU assigned by AMD/ATI. Note that ATI trademarks have been replaced by AMD trademarks starting with the Radeon HD 6000 series for desktop and AMD FirePro series for professional graphics.
- Codename – The internal engineering codename for the GPU.
- Launch – Date of release for the GPU.
- Architecture – The microarchitecture used by the GPU.
- Fab – Fabrication process. Average feature size of components of the GPU.
- Transistors – Number of transistors on the die.
- Die size – Physical surface area of the die.
- Core config – The layout of the graphics pipeline, in terms of functional units.
- Core clock – The reference base and boost (if available) core clock frequency.
- Fillrate
  - Pixel - The rate at which pixels can be rendered by the raster operators to a display. Measured in pixels/s.
  - Texture - The rate at which textures can be mapped by the texture mapping units onto a polygon mesh. Measured in texels/s.
- Performance
  - Shader operations - How many operations the pixel shaders (or unified shaders in Direct3D 10 and newer GPUs) can perform. Measured in operations/s.
  - Vertex operations - The amount of geometry operations that can be processed on the vertex shaders in one second (only applies to Direct3D 9.0c and older GPUs). Measured in vertices/s.
- Memory
  - Bus type – Type of memory bus utilized.
  - Bus width – Maximum bit width of the memory bus utilized.
  - Size – Size of the graphics memory.
  - Clock – The reference memory clock frequency.
  - Bandwidth – Maximum theoretical memory bandwidth based on bus type and width.
- TDP (Thermal design power) – Maximum amount of heat generated by the GPU chip, measured in Watt.
- TBP (Typical board power) – Typical power drawn by the total board, including power for the GPU chip and peripheral equipment, such as Voltage regulator module, memory, fans, etc., measured in Watt.
- Bus interface – Bus by which the graphics processor is attached to the system (typically an expansion slot, such as PCI, AGP, or PCIe).
- API support – Rendering and computing APIs supported by the GPU and driver.

Due to conventions changing over time, some numerical definitions such as core config, core clock, performance and memory should not be compared one-to-one across generations. The following tables are for reference use only, and do not reflect actual performance.

== Video codec acceleration ==
- R100 – Video Immersion
- R200 – Video Immersion II
- R300 – Video Immersion II + Video Shader
- R410 – Video Shader HD
- R420 – Video Shader HD + DXVA
- R520 – Avivo Video
- R600 – Avivo HD – UVD 1.0
- R700 – UVD 2, UVD 2.2
- Evergreen – UVD 2.3
- Northern Islands – UVD 3 (HD 67xx UVD 2.2)
- Southern Islands – UVD 3.1, VCE 1.0
- Sea Islands – UVD 4.2, VCE 2.0
- Volcanic Islands – UVD 5.0, 6.0, VCE 3.0
- Arctic Islands / Polaris – UVD 6.3, VCE 3.4
- Vega – UVD 7.0, VCE 4.0 and VCN 1.0 only at AMD Raven Ridge
- Navi 1X – VCN 2.0
- Navi 2X – VCN 3.0
- Navi 3X – VCN 3.0
- Navi 4X – VCN 5.0

== Features overview ==
The following table shows features of AMD/ATI's GPUs.

Name of GPU series	Wonder	Mach	3D Rage	Rage Pro	Rage 128	R100	R200	R300	R400	R500	R600	RV670	R700	Evergreen	Northern Islands		Southern Islands	Sea Islands	Volcanic Islands	Arctic Islands/Polaris	Vega	Navi 1x	Navi 2x	Navi 3x	Navi 4x
Released	1986	1991	Apr; 1996	Mar; 1997	Aug; 1998	Apr; 2000	Aug; 2001	Sep; 2002	May; 2004	Oct; 2005	May; 2007	Nov; 2007	Jun; 2008	Sep; 2009	Oct; 2010	Dec; 2010	Jan; 2012	Sep; 2013	Jun; 2015	Jun 2016, Apr 2017, Aug 2019	Jun 2017, Feb 2019	Jul; 2019	Nov; 2020	Dec; 2022	Feb; 2025
Marketing Name	Wonder	Mach	3D; Rage	Rage; Pro	Rage; 128	Radeon; 7000	Radeon; 8000	Radeon; 9000	Radeon; X700/X800	Radeon; X1000	Radeon; HD 2000	Radeon; HD 3000	Radeon; HD 4000	Radeon; HD 5000	Radeon; HD 6000		Radeon; HD 7000	Radeon; 200	Radeon; 300	Radeon; 400/500/600	Radeon; RX Vega, Radeon VII	Radeon; RX 5000	Radeon; RX 6000	Radeon; RX 7000	Radeon; RX 9000
AMD support	Ended																			Current					
Kind	2D		3D																						
Instruction set architecture	Not publicly known									Multiple (Note: R500 has two instruction sets. Vertex shader cores: "PVS instruction set". Pixel shader cores: "US instruction set".)	TeraScale instruction set						GCN instruction set					RDNA instruction set			
Microarchitecture	Not publicly known					GFX1		GFX2			TeraScale 1 (VLIW5) (GFX3)			TeraScale 2 (VLIW5) (GFX4)	TeraScale 2 (VLIW5) up to 68xx (GFX4)	TeraScale 3 (VLIW4) in 69xx (GFX5)	GCN 1st gen (GFX6)	GCN 2nd gen (GFX7)	GCN 3rd gen (GFX8)	GCN 4th gen (GFX8)	GCN 5th gen (GFX9)	RDNA (GFX10.1)	RDNA 2 (GFX10.3)	RDNA 3 (GFX11)	RDNA 4 (GFX12)
Type	Fixed pipeline (Note: The Radeon R100 Series has programmable pixel shaders, but do not fully comply with DirectX 8 or Pixel Shader 1.0. See article on R100's pixel shaders.)						Programmable pixel & vertex pipelines				Unified shader model														
Direct3D	—N/a		5.0	6.0		7.0	8.1	9.0; 11 (9_2)	9.0b 11 (9_2)	9.0c 11 (9_3)	10.0; 11 (10_0)	10.1; 11 (10_1)		11 (11_0)			11 (11_1); 12 (11_1)	11 (12_0); 12 (12_0)			11 (12_1); 12 (12_1)		11 (12_1); 12 (12_2)		
Shader model	—N/a						1.4	2.0+	2.0b	3.0	4.0	4.1		5.0			5.1	5.1; 6.5			6.7				6.8
OpenGL	—N/a			1.1	1.2	1.3		1.5 (Note: R300, R400 and R500 based cards do not fully comply with OpenGL 2+ as the hardware does not support all types of non-power of two (NPOT) textures.)			3.3			4.5 (Windows), 4.6 (Linux Mesa 25.2+)			4.6 (Note: OpenGL 4+ compliance requires supporting FP64 shaders and these are emulated on some TeraScale chips using 32-bit hardware.)								
Vulkan	—N/a															1.1 (Note: Vulkan support is theoretically possible but has not been implemented in a stable driver.)	1.3 (Note: Vulkan support in Linux relies on the AMDgpu kernel driver, the radeon driver does not support Vulkan.)		1.4						
OpenCL	—N/a										Close to Metal		1.1 (not supported by Mesa)	1.2+ (on Linux: 1.1+ (no Image support on Clover, with Rusticl) with Mesa, 1.2+ on GCN 1.Gen)				2.0+ (Adrenalin driver on Win 7+) (on Linux ROCm, Mesa 1.2+ (no support in Clover, only Rusticl, Mesa, 2.0+ and 3.0 with AMD drivers or AMD ROCm), 5th gen: 2.2 win 10+ and Linux RocM 5.0+				2.2+ and 3.0 Windows 8.1+ and Linux ROCm 5.0+ (Mesa Rusticl 1.2+ and 3.0 (2.1+ and 2.2+))			
HSA / ROCm	—N/a																Yes					?			
Video decoding ASIC	—N/a										Avivo/UVD	UVD+	UVD 2	UVD 2.2	UVD 3		UVD 4	UVD 4.2	UVD 5.0 or 6.0	UVD 6.3	UVD 7 (Note: The UVD and VCE were replaced by the Video Core Next (VCN) ASIC in the Raven Ridge APU implementation of Vega.)	VCN 2.0	VCN 3.0	VCN 4.0	VCN 5.0
Video encoding ASIC	—N/a																VCE 1.0	VCE 2.0	VCE 3.0 or 3.1	VCE 3.4	VCE 4.0	VCN 2.0	VCN 3.0	VCN 4.0	VCN 5.0
Fluid Motion (Note: Video processing for video frame rate interpolation technique. In Windows it works as a DirectShow filter in your player. In Linux, there is no support on the part of drivers and / or community.)	No																	Yes				No		?	
Power saving	?										PowerPlay				PowerTune		PowerTune & ZeroCore Power					?			
TrueAudio	—N/a																	Via dedicated DSP		Via shaders					
FreeSync	—N/a																	1; 2							
HDCP (Note: To play protected video content, it also requires card, operating system, driver, and application support. A compatible HDCP display is also needed for this. HDCP is mandatory for the output of certain audio formats, placing additional constraints on the multimedia setup.)	—N/a										?							1.4		2.2		2.3			
PlayReady	—N/a																			3.0	No	3.0			
Supported displays (Note: More displays may be supported with native DisplayPort connections, or splitting the maximum resolution between multiple monitors with active converters.)						1–2	2							2–6								?			4
Max. resolution	?													2–6 × 2560×1600			2–6 × 4096×2160 @ 30 Hz			2–6 × 5120×2880 @ 60 Hz	3 × 7680×4320 @ 60 Hz	7680×4320 @ 60 Hz PowerColor		7680x4320 @165 Hz	7680x4320
/drm/radeon (Note: DRM (Direct Rendering Manager) is a component of the Linux kernel. AMDgpu is the Linux kernel module. Support in this table refers to the most current version.)						Yes													—N/a						
/drm/amdgpu	—N/a																Yes Kernel 6.19+		Yes						

== API overview ==
The following table shows the graphics and compute APIs support across ATI/AMD GPU microarchitectures. Note that a branding series might include older generation chips.

Chip series	Microarchitecture	Fab	Supported APIs					AMD support	Year introduced	Introduced with
Chip series	Microarchitecture	Fab	Rendering			Computing / ROCm		AMD support	Year introduced	Introduced with
Chip series	Microarchitecture	Fab	Vulkan	OpenGL	Direct3D	HSA	OpenCL	AMD support	Year introduced	Introduced with
Wonder	Fixed-pipeline (Note: Radeon 7000 Series has programmable pixel shaders, but do not fully comply with DirectX 8 or Pixel Shader 1.0. See article on R100's pixel shaders.)	1000 nm 800 nm	—N/a	—N/a	—N/a	—N/a	—N/a	Ended	1986	Graphics Solutions
Mach	Fixed-pipeline	800 nm 600 nm	—N/a	—N/a	—N/a	—N/a	—N/a	Ended	1991	Mach8
3D Rage	Fixed-pipeline	500 nm	—N/a	—N/a	5.0	—N/a	—N/a	Ended	1996	3D Rage
Rage Pro	Fixed-pipeline	350 nm	—N/a	1.1	6.0	—N/a	—N/a	Ended	1997	Rage Pro
Rage 128	Fixed-pipeline	250 nm	—N/a	1.2	6.0	—N/a	—N/a	Ended	1998	Rage 128 GL/VR
R100	Fixed-pipeline	180 nm 150 nm	—N/a	1.3	7.0	—N/a	—N/a	Ended	2000	Radeon
R200	Programmable pixel & vertex pipelines	150 nm	—N/a	1.3	8.1	—N/a	—N/a	Ended	2001	Radeon 8500
R300	Programmable pixel & vertex pipelines	150 nm 130 nm 110 nm	—N/a	2.0 (Note: These series do not fully comply with OpenGL 2+ as the hardware does not support all types of non-power-of-two (NPOT) textures.)	9.0; 11 (FL 9_2)	—N/a	—N/a	Ended	2002	Radeon 9700
R420	Programmable pixel & vertex pipelines	130 nm 110 nm	—N/a	2.0	9.0b 11 (FL 9_2)	—N/a	—N/a	Ended	2004	Radeon X800
R520	Programmable pixel & vertex pipelines	90 nm 80 nm	—N/a	2.0	9.0c 11 (FL 9_3)	—N/a	—N/a	Ended	2005	Radeon X1800
R600	TeraScale 1	80 nm 65 nm	—N/a	3.3	10.0; 11 (FL 10_0)	—N/a	ATI Stream	Ended	2007	Radeon HD 2900 XT
RV670	TeraScale 1	55 nm	—N/a	3.3	10.1; 11 (FL 10_1)	—N/a	ATI Stream APP	Ended	2007	Radeon HD 3850/3870
RV770	TeraScale 1	55 nm 40 nm	—N/a	3.3	10.1; 11 (FL 10_1)	—N/a	1.0	Ended	2008	Radeon HD 4850/4870
Evergreen	TeraScale 2	40 nm	—N/a	4.5 (Linux 4.2-4.6) (Note: OpenGL 4+ compliance requires supporting FP64 shaders and these are emulated on some TeraScale chips using 32-bit hardware.)	11 (FL 11_0)	—N/a	1.2	Ended	2009	Radeon HD 5850/5870
Northern Islands	TeraScale 2 TeraScale 3	40 nm	—N/a	4.5 (Linux 4.2-4.6)	11 (FL 11_0)	—N/a	1.2	Ended	2010	Radeon HD 6850/6870; Radeon HD 6950/6970
Southern Islands	GCN 1^{st} gen	28 nm	1.0 (Windows) 1.3 (Linux)	4.6	11 (FL 11_1); 12 (FL11_1)	Yes	1.2; 2.0 possible	Ended	2012	Radeon HD 7950/7970
Sea Islands	GCN 2^{nd} gen	28 nm	1.2 (Windows) 1.3 (Linux)	4.6	11 (FL 12_0); 12 (FL 12_0)	Yes	2.0 (1.2 in MacOS, Linux); 2.1 Beta in Linux ROCm; 2.2 possible	Ended	2013	Radeon HD 7790
Volcanic Islands	GCN 3^{rd} gen	28 nm	1.2 (Windows) 1.4 (Linux)	4.6	11 (FL 12_0); 12 (FL 12_0)	Yes	2.0 (1.2 in MacOS, Linux); 2.1 Beta in Linux ROCm; 2.2 possible	Ended	2014	Radeon R9 285
Arctic Islands	GCN 4^{th} gen	28 nm 14 nm	1.3 (Windows) 1.4 (Linux)	4.6	11 (FL 12_0); 12 (FL 12_0)	Yes	2.0 (1.2 in MacOS, Linux); 2.1 Beta in Linux ROCm; 2.2 possible	Supported	2016	Radeon RX 480
Polaris	GCN 4^{th} gen	28 nm 14 nm	1.3 (Windows) 1.4 (Linux)	4.6	11 (FL 12_0); 12 (FL 12_0)	Yes	2.0 (1.2 in MacOS, Linux); 2.1 Beta in Linux ROCm; 2.2 possible	Supported	2017	Radeon 520/530; Radeon RX 530/550/570/580
Vega	GCN 5^{th} gen	14 nm 7 nm	1.3 (Windows) 1.4 (Linux)	4.6	11 (FL 12_1); 12 (FL 12_1)	Yes	2.0 (1.2 in MacOS, Linux); 2.1 Beta in Linux ROCm; 2.2 possible	Supported	2017	Radeon Vega Frontier Edition
Navi	RDNA	7 nm	1.4	4.6	11 (FL 12_1); 12 (FL 12_1)	Yes	2.0 (1.2 in MacOS, Linux); 2.1 Beta in Linux ROCm; 2.2 possible	Supported	2019	Radeon RX 5700 (XT)
Navi 2x	RDNA 2	7 nm 6 nm	1.4	4.6	11 (FL 12_1); 12 (FL 12_2)	Yes	2.0 (1.2 in MacOS, Linux); 2.1 Beta in Linux ROCm; 2.2 possible	Supported	2020	Radeon RX 6800 (XT)
Navi 3x	RDNA 3	6 nm 5 nm	1.4	4.6	11 (FL 12_1); 12 (FL 12_2)	Yes	2.0 (1.2 in MacOS, Linux); 2.1 Beta in Linux ROCm; 2.2 possible	Supported	2022	Radeon RX 7900 XT(X)
Navi 4x	RDNA 4	4 nm	1.4	4.6	11 (FL 12_1); 12 (FL 12_2)	Yes	2.0 (1.2 in MacOS, Linux); 2.1 Beta in Linux ROCm; 2.2 possible	Supported	2025	Radeon RX 9070 (XT)

== Desktop GPUs ==
=== Wonder series ===
Model	Launch	Fab (nm)	Bus interface	Memory		
Model	Launch	Fab (nm)	Bus interface	Size (KiB)	Bus type	Bus width (bit)
Wonder MDA/CGA	1986	1000	PC/XT	64	DRAM	8
Wonder EGA	1987	1000	PC/XT	256	DRAM	8
Wonder VGA	1987	1000, 800	PC/XT, ISA	256, 512; 1024	DRAM	8, 16

=== Mach series ===
Model	Launch	Fab (nm)	Bus interface	Memory		
Model	Launch	Fab (nm)	Bus interface	Size (KiB)	Bus type	Bus width (bit)
Mach 8	1991	800	ISA, MCA	512, 1024	DRAM, VRAM	32
Mach 32	1992	800	ISA, EISA, VLB, PCI, MCA	1024, 2048	DRAM, VRAM	64
Mach 64 CX	1994	700	ISA, VLB, PCI	1024, 2048, 4096	DRAM, VRAM	64
Mach 64 GX	1994	700	ISA, VLB, PCI	1024, 2048, 4096	DRAM, VRAM	64
Mach 64 CT	1995	600	PCI	1024, 2048, 4096	DRAM, VRAM, EDO	64
Mach 64 VT (264VT)	1995	600	PCI	1024, 2048, 4096	DRAM, VRAM, EDO	64
Mach 64 VT2 (264VT2)	1996	600	PCI	1024, 2048, 4096	EDO	64
Mach 64 VT4 (264VT4)	1998	600	PCI	2048, 4096	EDO, SGRAM	64

=== Rage series ===
Model	Launch	GPU arch	Fab (nm)	Bus interface	Core clock (MHz)	Memory clock (MHz)	Core config^{1}	Fillrate				Memory				Performance (FLOPS)	TDP (Watts)	API compliance	
Model	Launch	GPU arch	Fab (nm)	Bus interface	Core clock (MHz)	Memory clock (MHz)	Core config^{1}	MOperations/s	MPixels/s	MTexels/s	MVertices/s	Size (MiB)	Bandwidth (GB/s)	Bus type	Bus width (bit)	Performance (FLOPS)	TDP (Watts)	Direct3D	OpenGL
3D Rage	April 1996	Rage	500	PCI	40	40	1:0:1:1	40	40	40	0	2	0.32	EDO	64	?	?	5.0	None^{2}
3D Rage II	September 1996	Rage II	500	AGP 1× (Rage IIc only), PCI	60	83 (66 MHz with EDO)	1:0:1:1	60	60	60	0	2, 4, 8	0.664	EDO, SGRAM, SDR	64	?	?	5.0	None^{2}
Rage Pro	March 1997	Rage 3	350	AGP 1x, AGP 2×, PCI	75	75 100	1:0:1:1	75	75	75	0	4, 8, 16	0.6 0.8	EDO, SGRAM, SDR	64	?	6	6.0	1.1
Rage XL	August 1998	Rage 3	250	AGP 2×, PCI	83	125	1:0:1:1	83	83	83	0	8	1.0	SDR	64	?	9	6.0	1.1
Rage 128 VR	August 1998	Rage 4	250	AGP 2×, PCI	80	120	2:0:2:2	160	160	160	0	8, 32	0.96	SDR	64	?	?	6.0	1.2
Rage 128 GL	August 1998	Rage 4	250	AGP 2×, PCI	103	103	2:0:2:2	206	206	206	0	16, 32	1.648	SGRAM, SDR	128	?	?	6.0	1.2
Rage 128 Pro	August 1999	Rage 4	250	AGP 4×, PCI	125	143	2:0:2:2	250	250	250	0	16, 32	2.288	SGRAM, SDR	128	?	5	6.0	1.2
Rage 128 Ultra	August 1999	Rage 4	250	AGP 4×, PCI	130	130	2:0:2:2	260	260	260	0	16, 32	2.088	SDR	128	?	?	6.0	1.2
Rage Fury MAXX	October 1999	Rage 4	250	AGP 4×	125	143	2:0:2:2 ×2	500	500	500	0	32 ×2	4.576	SDR	128 ×2	?	?	6.0	1.2

^{1} Pixel pipelines : Vertex shaders : Texture mapping units : Render output units
^{2} OpenGL 1.0 (Generic 2D) is provided through software implementations.

=== Radeon R100 series ===
- All models support Direct3D 7.0 and OpenGL 1.3
- The R100 cards were originally launched without any numbering as Radeon SDR, DDR, LE and VE; these products were later "rebranded" to their names within the numbered naming scheme, when the Radeon 8000 series was introduced.

Model	Launch	Code name	Fab (nm)	Bus interface	Core clock (MHz)	Memory clock (MHz)	Core config^{1}	Fillrate				Memory				Performance (FLOPS)	TDP (Watts)
Model	Launch	Code name	Fab (nm)	Bus interface	Core clock (MHz)	Memory clock (MHz)	Core config^{1}	MOperations/s	MPixels/s	MTexels/s	MVertices/s	Size (MiB)	Bandwidth (GB/s)	Bus type	Bus width (bit)	Performance (FLOPS)	TDP (Watts)
Radeon VE / Radeon 7000	February 19, 2001	RV100 (piglet)	180	AGP 4x, PCI	150/166/183	150/166/183	1:0:3:1	183 (max)	336 (max)	549 (max)	0	32, 64	2.688 (max)	DDR	64	?	10
Radeon LE / Radeon 7100 (OEM)	April 6, 2001	Rage 6 / R100	180	AGP 4x	150	150	2:1:6:2	296	296	888	37.5	32	4.736	DDR	128	?	11
Radeon SDR / Radeon 7200 (SDR)	June 1, 2000	Rage 6 / R100	180	AGP 4x, PCI	166	166	2:1:6:2	333	333	996	41.5	32	2.656	SDR	128	?	14
Radeon DDR / Radeon 7200 (DDR)	April 1, 2000	Rage 6 / R100	180	AGP 4x	166/183^{A}	166/183^{A}	2:1:6:2	333/366^{A}	333/366^{A}	966/1098^{A}	41.5/45.75^{A}	32, 64	5.312/5.856^{A}	DDR	128	?	13
Radeon DDR / Radeon 7200 VIVO	2001	Rage 6 / R100	180	AGP 4x, PCI	166/183^{B}	166/183^{B}	2:1:6:2	333/366^{B}	333/366^{B}	966/1098^{B}	41.5/45.75^{B}	64	5.312/5.856^{B}	DDR	128	?	17
Radeon DDR / Radeon 7500 VIVO "SE"	2001	Rage 6 / R100	180	AGP 4x, PCI	200	200	2:1:6:2	400	400	1200	50.0	64	6.400	DDR	128	?	20
Radeon 7500 LE		RV200 (morpheus)	150	AGP 4x, PCI	250	175	2:1:6:2	500	500	1500	62.5	32, 64	5.600	DDR	64; 128	?	21
Radeon 7500	August 14, 2001	RV200 (morpheus)	150	AGP 4x, PCI	290	230	2:1:6:2	580	580	1740	72.5	32, 64, 128	7.360	DDR	128	?	23

^{1} Pixel pipelines : Vertex shaders : Texture mapping units : Render output units

^{A} First number indicates cards with 32 MB of memory. Second number indicates cards with 64 MB of memory.
^{B} First number indicates OEM cards. Second number indicates Retail cards.

==== IGP (3xx series) ====
- All models are manufactured with a 180 nm fabrication process
- All models support Direct3D 7.0 and OpenGL 1.3
- Based on the Radeon VE

Model	Launch	Code name	Bus interface	Core clock (MHz)	Memory clock (MHz)	Core config^{1}	Fillrate				Memory			
Model	Launch	Code name	Bus interface	Core clock (MHz)	Memory clock (MHz)	Core config^{1}	MOperations/s	MPixels/s	MTexels/s	MVertices/s	Size (MiB)	Bandwidth (GB/s)	Bus type	Bus width (bit)
Radeon 320	May 2002	A3	FSB	160	200, 266	1:0:3:1	160	160	480	0	?	1.6, 2.128	DDR	64
Radeon 330	2002	RS200L (wilma)	FSB	150	200, 266	1:0:3:1	150	150	450	0	?	1.6, 2.128	DDR	64
Radeon 340	2002	RS200 (wilma)	FSB	183	200, 266	1:0:3:1	183	183	549	0	?	1.6, 2.128	DDR	64

^{1} Pixel pipelines : Vertex shaders : Texture mapping units : Render output units

=== Radeon R200 series ===
- All models are manufactured with a 150 nm fabrication process
- All models support Direct3D 8.1 and OpenGL 1.4

Model	Launch	Code name	Bus interface	Core clock (MHz)	Memory clock (MHz)	Core config^{1}	Fillrate				Memory				Performance (FLOPS)	TDP (Watts)
Model	Launch	Code name	Bus interface	Core clock (MHz)	Memory clock (MHz)	Core config^{1}	MOperations/s	MPixels/s	MTexels/s	MVertices/s	Size (MiB)	Bandwidth (GB/s)	Bus type	Bus width (bit)	Performance (FLOPS)	TDP (Watts)
Radeon 8500	August 14, 2001	R200 (chaplin)	AGP 4×, PCI	275	275	4:2:8:4	1100	1100	2200	137.5	64, 128	8.8	DDR	128	?	33
Radeon 8500 LE	October 30, 2001	R200 (chaplin)	AGP 4×, PCI	250	200 250	4:2:8:4	1000	1000	2000	125	64, 128	8	DDR	128	?	?
Radeon 9000	August 1, 2002	RV250 (iris)	AGP 4×, PCI	250	200	4:1:4:4	1000	1000	1000	50	64, 128	6.4	DDR	128	?	?
Radeon 9000 Pro	August 1, 2002	RV250 (iris)	AGP 4×, PCI	275	275	4:1:4:4	1100	1100	1100	68.75	64, 128	8.8	DDR	128	?	?
Radeon 9100	April 1, 2003	R200 (chaplin)	AGP 4×, PCI	250	200 250	4:2:8:4	1000	1000	2000	125	64, 128	8.0 4.0	DDR	128		
Radeon 9100	April 1, 2003	R200 (chaplin)	AGP 4×, PCI	250	200 250	4:2:8:4	1000	1000	2000	125	64, 128	8.0 4.0	DDR	128 64	?	?
Radeon 9200	April 1, 2003	RV280 (argus)	AGP 8×, PCI	250	200	4:1:4:4	1000	1000	1000	62.5	64, 128, 256	6.4	DDR	128	?	?
Radeon 9200 SE	March 1, 2003	RV280 (argus)	AGP 8×, PCI	200	166	4:1:4:4	800	800	800	50	64, 128, 256	2.67	DDR	64	?	?
Radeon 9250	March 1, 2004	RV280 (argus)	AGP 8×, PCI	240	200	4:1:4:4	960	960	960	60	64, 128, 256	3.2, 6.4	DDR	64, 128	?	?
Radeon 9250 SE	2004	RV280 (argus)	AGP 8x			4:1:4:4					64, 128, 256		DDR	64	?	?

^{1} Pixel shaders : Vertex shaders : Texture mapping units : Render output units

==== IGP (9000 series) ====
- All models are manufactured with a 150 nm fabrication process
- All models support Direct3D 8.1 and OpenGL 1.4
- Based on the Radeon 9200

Model	Launch	Code name	Bus interface	Core clock (MHz)	Memory clock (MHz)	Core config^{1}	Fillrate				Memory			
Model	Launch	Code name	Bus interface	Core clock (MHz)	Memory clock (MHz)	Core config^{1}	MOperations/s	MPixels/s	MTexels/s	MVertices/s	Size (MiB)	Bandwidth (GB/s)	Bus type	Bus width (bit)
Radeon 9000	2003	RC350	FSB	300	400	4:1:2:2	600	600	600	75	16 - 128	3.2	DDR	64
Radeon 9100	2003	RS300 (superman)	FSB	300	400	4:1:2:2	600	600	600	75	16 - 128	6.4	DDR	128
Radeon 9100 Pro	May 3, 2004	RS350	FSB	300	400	4:1:2:2	600	600	600	75	16 - 128	6.4	DDR	128

^{1} Pixel shaders : Vertex shaders : Texture mapping units : Render output units

=== Radeon R300 series ===
==== AGP (9000 series, X1000 series) ====
- All models support Direct3D 9.0 and OpenGL 2.0
- All models use an AGP 8x interface

Model	Launch	Code name	Fab (nm)	Core clock (MHz)	Memory clock (MHz)	Core config^{1}	Fillrate				Memory				Performance (GFLOPS)	TDP (Watts)
Model	Launch	Code name	Fab (nm)	Core clock (MHz)	Memory clock (MHz)	Core config^{1}	MOperations/s	MPixels/s	MTexels/s	MVertices/s	Size (MiB)	Bandwidth (GB/s)	Bus type	Bus width (bit)	Performance (GFLOPS)	TDP (Watts)
Radeon 9500	October 24, 2002	R300 (Khan)	150	275	270	4:4:4:4	1100	1100	1100	275	64, 128	8.64 17.28	DDR	128 256	?	29
Radeon 9500 Pro	October 24, 2002	R300 (Khan)	150	275	270	8:4:8:8	2200	2200	2200	275	128	8.64	DDR	128	?	50
Radeon 9550 SE	April-summer 2004	RV350 (Shivah)	130	250	200	4:2:4:4	1000	1000	1000	125	64, 128, 256	3.2	DDR	64	?	?
Radeon 9550	April-summer 2004	RV350 (Shivah)	130	250	200	4:2:4:4	1000	1000	1000	125	64, 128, 256	6.4	DDR	128	?	?
Radeon 9600	2003	RV350 (Shivah)	130	325	200	4:2:4:4	1300	1300	1300	162.5	128, 256	6.4	DDR	128	?	17
Radeon 9600 Pro	March 6, 2003	RV350 (Shivah)	130	400	300	4:2:4:4	1600	1600	1600	200	128, 256	9.6	DDR	128	?	19
Radeon 9600 SE	2003	RV350 (Shivah)	130	325	200	4:2:4:4	1300	1300	1300	162.5	64, 128, 256	3.2	DDR	64	?	?
Radeon 9650	April 27, 2005 (Apple OEM)	RV350 (Shivah)	130	400	270	4:2:4:4	1600	1600	1600	200	256	9.6	DDR	128	?	?
Radeon 9600 XT	September 30, 2003	RV360	130	500	300	4:2:4:4	2000	2000	2000	250	128, 256	9.6	DDR	128	?	20
Radeon 9600 TX	2003 (Medion OEM)	R300 (Khan)	150	297	270	8:4:8:8	2376	2376	2376	287	128	8.6	DDR	128	?	?
Radeon 9700 TX	2002 (Dell OEM)	R300 (Khan)	150	263	263	8:4:8:8	2104	2104	2104	275	128	16.83	DDR	256	?	?
Radeon 9700	October 24, 2002	R300 (Khan)	150	275	270	8:4:8:8	2200	2200	2200	275	128	17.28	DDR	256	?	42
Radeon 9700 Pro	July 18, 2002	R300 (Khan)	150	325	310	8:4:8:8	2600	2600	2600	325	128	19.84	DDR	256	?	50
Radeon 9800	2003	R350	150	325	310	8:4:8:8	2600	2600	2600	325	128	19.84	DDR	256	?	40
Radeon 9800 XL	2003	R350	150	350	310	8:4:8:8	2800	2800	2800	350	128	19.84	DDR	256	?	?
Radeon 9800 XXL	October 1, 2003	R360	150	390	338	8:4:8:8	3120	3120	3120	390	128	21.60	DDR	256	?	?
Radeon 9800 Pro (R350)	March 1, 2003	R350	150	380	340 (128 MB) 350 (256 MB)	8:4:8:8	3040	3040	3040	380	128 256	21.76 22.40	DDR GDDR2	256	?	53
Radeon 9800 Pro (R360)	2003	R360	150	380	340	8:4:8:8	3040	3040	3040	380	128	21.76	DDR	256	?	51
Radeon 9800 SE	March 1, 2003	R350	150	325 380	270 340	4:4:4:4	1300 1520	1300 1520	1300 1520	325 380	128 256	8.64 21.76	DDR	128 256^{2}	?	50
Radeon 9800 XT	September 9, 2003	R360	150	412	365	8:4:8:8	3296	3296	3296	412	256	23.36	DDR	256	?	74
Radeon X1050 AGP	December 7, 2006	RV350 (Shivah)	130	250	200	4:2:4:4	1000	1000	1000	125	128, 256	6.4	DDR	128	?	?
Model	Launch	Code name	Fab (nm)	Core clock (MHz)	Memory clock (MHz)	Core config^{1}	MOperations/s	MPixels/s	MTexels/s	MVertices/s	Size (MiB)	Bandwidth (GB/s)	Bus type	Bus width (bit)	Performance (GFLOPS)	TDP (Watts)
Model	Launch	Code name	Fab (nm)	Core clock (MHz)	Memory clock (MHz)	Core config^{1}	Fillrate				Memory				Performance (GFLOPS)	TDP (Watts)

^{1} Pixel shaders : Vertex Shaders : Texture mapping units : Render output units
^{2} The 256-bit version of the 9800 SE when unlocked to 8-pixel pipelines with third party driver modifications should function close to a full 9800 Pro.

==== PCIe (X3xx, X5xx, X6xx, X1000 series) ====
- All models support Direct3D 9.0 and OpenGL 2.0
- All models use a PCIe ×16 interface

Model	Launch	Code name	Fab (nm)	Core clock (MHz)	Memory clock (MHz)	Core config^{1}	Fillrate				Memory				Performance (GFLOPS)	TDP (Watts)
Model	Launch	Code name	Fab (nm)	Core clock (MHz)	Memory clock (MHz)	Core config^{1}	MOperations/s	MPixels/s	MTexels/s	MVertices/s	Size (MiB)	Bandwidth (GB/s)	Bus type	Bus width (bit)	Performance (GFLOPS)	TDP (Watts)
Radeon X300	September 1, 2004	RV370 (hari)	110	325	200	4:2:4:4	1300	1300	1300	162.5	64, 128	6.4	DDR	128	?	26
Radeon X300 LE	September 1, 2004	RV370 (hari)	110	325	200	4:2:4:4	1300	1300	1300	162.5	64, 128	6.4	DDR	128	?	?
Radeon X300 SE	September 1, 2004	RV370 (hari)	110	325	200	4:2:4:4	1300	1300	1300	162.5	64, 128	3.2	DDR	64	?	25
Radeon X300 SE HyperMemory	April 4, 2005	RV370 (hari)	110	325	300	4:2:4:4	1300	1300	1300	162.5	32, 64, 128 onboard + up to 128 system	3.2	DDR	64	?	?
Radeon X550	June 21, 2005	RV370 (hari)	110	400	250	4:2:4:4	1600	1600	1600	200	128, 256	8 4	DDR	128 64	?	?
Radeon X550 HyperMemory	June 21, 2005	RV370 (hari)	110	400	250	4:2:4:4	1600	1600	1600	200	128, 256 onboard + up to 512 system	8 4	DDR	128 64	?	?
Radeon X600 SE	September 1, 2004	RV370 (hari)	110	325	250	4:2:4:4	1300	1300	1300	162.5	128, 256	4	DDR	64	?	?
Radeon X600	September 1, 2004	RV370 (hari)	110	400	250	4:2:4:4	1600	1600	1600	200	128, 256	8	DDR	128	?	30
Radeon X600 Pro (RV370)	September 1, 2004	RV370 (hari)	110	400	300	4:2:4:4	1600	1600	1600	200	128, 256	9.6	DDR	128	?	30
Radeon X600 Pro (RV380)	September 1, 2004	RV380 (vishnu)	130	400	300	4:2:4:4	1600	1600	1600	200	128, 256	9.6	DDR	128	?	31
Radeon X600 XT	September 1, 2004	RV380 (vishnu)	130	500	370	4:2:4:4	2000	2000	2000	250	128, 256	11.84	DDR	128	?	?
Radeon X1050 (RV370)	December 7, 2006	RV370 (hari)	110	400	250; 333	4:2:4:4	1600	1600	1600	200	128, 256	5.328	DDR; DDR2	64; 128	?	?

^{1} Pixel shaders : Vertex Shaders : Texture mapping units : Render output units

==== IGP (X2xx, 11xx series) ====
- All models support Direct3D 9.0 and OpenGL 2.0
- Based on the Radeon X300

Model	Launch	Code name	Fab (nm)	Bus interface	Core clock (MHz)	Memory clock (MHz)	Core config^{1}	Fillrate				Memory			
Model	Launch	Code name	Fab (nm)	Bus interface	Core clock (MHz)	Memory clock (MHz)	Core config^{1}	MOperations/s	MPixels/s	MTexels/s	MVertices/s	Size (MiB)	Bandwidth (GB/s)	Bus type	Bus width (bit)
Radeon Xpress X200	November 8, 2004	RS480 (metallo)	130	HT	300	200-400 (DDR), 200 (sideport)	4:2:2:2	600	600	600	0	16-128 system + 16 sideport	1.6-6.4 system + 0.8 sideport	DDR	64, 128
Radeon Xpress 1100 (originally Xpress 200)	2005	RS482 (grayskull)	110	HT	300	200-400 (DDR), 400-800 (DDR2)	4:2:2:2	600	600	600	0	16-128 system	1.6- 12.8 system	DDR, DDR2	64, 128
Radeon Xpress 1150 (originally Xpress 200 for Intel)	March 11, 2005 (Intel), May 23, 2006 (AMD)	RC400, RC410, RS400, RS415, RS485	110	HT, FSB	400	200-400 (DDR), 400-800 (DDR2)	4:2:2:2	800	800	800	0	16-128 system	1.6-12.8	DDR, DDR2	64, 128

^{1}Pixel shaders : Vertex Shaders : Texture mapping units : Render output units

=== Radeon R400 series ===
==== AGP (X7xx, X8xx) ====
- All models support AGP 8×
- All models support Direct3D 9.0b and OpenGL 2.0

Model	Launch	Code name	Fab (nm)	Core clock (MHz)	Memory clock (MHz)	Core config^{1}	Fillrate				Memory				Performance (FLOPS)	TDP (Watts)
Model	Launch	Code name	Fab (nm)	Core clock (MHz)	Memory clock (MHz)	Core config^{1}	MOperations/s	MPixels/s	MTexels/s	MVertices/s	Size (MB)	Bandwidth (GB/s)	Bus type	Bus width (bit)	Performance (FLOPS)	TDP (Watts)
Radeon X700	Mar 2005	RV410 (alto)	110	400	350	8:6:8:8	3200	3200	3200	600	128, 256	11.2	DDR	128	?	31
Radeon X700 Pro	Mar 1, 2005	RV410 (alto)	110	425	432	8:6:8:8	3400	3400	3400	637.5	128, 256	13.824	GDDR3	128	?	39
Radeon X800 SE	Oct 2004	R420 (loki)	130	425	400	8:6:8:8	3400	6800	3400	637.5	256	25.6	GDDR3	256	?	?
Radeon X800 GT	December 6, 2005	R420 (loki)	130	475	490	8:6:8:16	3800	7600	3800	712.5	256	31.36	GDDR3	256	?	35
Radeon X800	Dec. 2004	R430	110	400	350	12:6:12:16	4800	6400	4800	600	256	22.4	GDDR3	256	?	?
Radeon X800 GTO	December 6, 2005	R420 (loki)	130	400	490	12:6:12:16	4800	6400	4800	600	256	31.36	GDDR3	256	?	31
Radeon X800 Pro	May 5, 2004	R420 (loki)	130	475	450	12:6:12:16	5700	7600	5700	712.5	256	28.8	GDDR3	256	?	49
Radeon X800 XL	February 2, 2005	R430	110	400	490	16:6:16:16	6400	6400	6400	600	256	31.36	GDDR3	256	?	57
Radeon X800 XT	May 4, 2004	R420 (loki)	130	500	500	16:6:16:16	8000	8000	8000	750	256	32	GDDR3	256	?	86
Radeon X800 XT PE	May 4, 2004	R420 (loki)	130	520	560	16:6:16:16	8320	8320	8320	780	256	35.84	GDDR3	256	?	87
Radeon X850 Pro	February 28, 2005	R481	130	507	520	12:6:12:16	6084	8112	6084	760.5	256	33.28	GDDR3	256	?	?
Radeon X850 XT	February 28, 2005	R481	130	520	540	16:6:16:16	8320	8320	8320	780	256	34.56	GDDR3	256	?	86
Radeon X850 XT PE	February 28, 2005	R481	130	540	590	16:6:16:16	8640	8640	8640	810	256	37.76	GDDR3	256	?	?

^{1} Pixel shaders : Vertex shaders : Texture mapping units : Render output units

==== PCIe (X5xx, X7xx, X8xx, X1000 series) ====
- All models support PCIe ×16
- All models support Direct3D 9.0b and OpenGL 2.0

Model	Launch	Code name	Fab (nm)	Core clock (MHz)	Memory clock (MHz)	Core config^{1}	Fillrate				Memory				Performance (FLOPS)	TDP (Watts)
Model	Launch	Code name	Fab (nm)	Core clock (MHz)	Memory clock (MHz)	Core config^{1}	MOperations/s	MPixels/s	MTexels/s	MVertices/s	Size (MB)	Bandwidth (GB/s)	Bus type	Bus width (bit)	Performance (FLOPS)	TDP (Watts)
Radeon X550 XT	January 24, 2007	RV410 (alto)	110	400	300	4:6:4:8	1600	3200	1600	600	128	4.8 9.6	DDR GDDR3	64 128	?	?
Radeon X550 XTX	January 24, 2007	RV410 (alto)	110	400	300	8:6:8:8	3200	3200	3200	600	128	4.8 9.6	DDR GDDR3	64 128	?	?
Radeon X700 SE	April 1, 2005	RV410 (alto)	110	400	200; 250	4:6:4:8	1600	3200	1600	600	128	3.2	DDR	64	?	?
Radeon X700 LE	December 21, 2004	RV410 (alto)	110	400	250	8:6:8:8	3200	3200	3200	600	128	4	DDR	64	?	29
Radeon X1050 (RV410)	Jan, 25, 2008	RV410 (alto)	110	400	200	8:6:8:8	3200	3200	3200	600	128, 256	6.4	DDR	128	?	20
Radeon X700	Sept. 2005	RV410 (alto)	110	400	250; 350	8:6:8:8	3200	3200	3200	600	128, 256	8; 11.2	DDR	128	?	31
Radeon X700 Pro	December 21, 2004	RV410 (alto)	110	425	432	8:6:8:8	3400	3400	3400	637.5	128, 256	13.824	GDDR3	128	?	39
Radeon X700 XT	Never Released	RV410 (alto)	110	475	525	8:6:8:8	3800	3800	3800	712.5	128, 256	16.8	GDDR3	128	?	38
Radeon X740 XL	March 7, 2005 (Medion OEM)	RV410 (alto)	110	425	450	8:6:8:8	3400	3400	3400	637.5	128	14.4	GDDR3	128	?	34
Radeon X800 GT 128 MB	August 1, 2005	R423; R480 (thor)	130	475	175	8:6:8:16	3800	7600	3800	712.5	128	22.4	DDR	256	?	32
Radeon X800 GT 256 MB	August 1, 2005	R423; R480 (thor)	130	475	490	8:6:8:16	3800	7600	3800	712.5	256	31.36	GDDR3	256	?	35
Radeon X800	December 1, 2004	R430 (thor)	110	392	350	12:6:12:16	4704	6272	4704	588	128, 256	22.4	GDDR3	256	?	?
Radeon X800 GTO 128 MB	September 15, 2005	R423; R480; R430 (thor)	130; 110	400	350	12:6:12:16	4800	6400	4800	600	128	22.4	GDDR3	256	?	30
Radeon X800 GTO 256 MB	September 15, 2005	R423; R480; R430 (thor)	130; 110	400	490	12:6:12:16	4800	6400	4800	600	256	31.36	GDDR3	256	?	31
Radeon X800 Pro	May 5, 2004	R423 (thor)	130	475	450	12:6:12:16	5700	7600	5700	712.5	256	28.8	GDDR3	256	?	49
Radeon X800 XL	December 1, 2004 (256 MB); May 4, 2005 (512 MB)	R430 (thor)	110	400	490	16:6:16:16	6400	6400	6400	600	256, 512	31.36	GDDR3	256	?	56
Radeon X800 XT	December 1, 2004	R423 (thor)	130	500	500	16:6:16:16	8000	8000	8000	750	256	32	GDDR3	256	?	83
Radeon X800 XT Platinum Edition	May 5, 2004	R423 (thor)	130	520	560	16:6:16:16	8320	8320	8320	780	256	35.84	GDDR3	256	?	88
Radeon X850 Pro	December 1, 2004	R480 (thor)	130	507	520	12:6:12:16	6084	8112	6084	760.5	256	33.28	GDDR3	256	?	?
Radeon X850 XT	December 1, 2004	R480 (thor)	130	520	540	16:6:16:16	8320	8320	8320	780	256	34.56	GDDR3	256	?	86
Radeon X850 XT CrossFire Master	September 29, 2004	R480 (thor)	130	520	540	16:6:16:16	8320	8320	8320	780	256	34.56	GDDR3	256	?	?
Radeon X850 XT Platinum Edition	December 21, 2004	R480 (thor)	130	540	590	16:6:16:16	8640	8640	8640	810	256	37.76	GDDR3	256	?	?
Model	Launch	Code name	Fab (nm)	Core clock (MHz)	Memory clock (MHz)	Core config^{1}	MOperations/s	MPixels/s	MTexels/s	MVertices/s	Size (MB)	Bandwidth (GB/s)	Bus type	Bus width (bit)	Performance (FLOPS)	TDP (Watts)
Model	Launch	Code name	Fab (nm)	Core clock (MHz)	Memory clock (MHz)	Core config^{1}	Fillrate				Memory				Performance (FLOPS)	TDP (Watts)

^{1} Pixel shaders : Vertex Shaders : Texture mapping units : Render output units

==== IGP (X12xx, 21xx) ====
- All models support Direct3D 9.0b and OpenGL 2.0
- Based on Radeon X700

Model	Launch	Code name	Fab (nm)	Bus interface	Core clock (MHz)	Memory clock (MHz)	Core config^{1}	Fillrate				Memory			
Model	Launch	Code name	Fab (nm)	Bus interface	Core clock (MHz)	Memory clock (MHz)	Core config^{1}	MOperations/s	MPixels/s	MTexels/s	MVertices/s	Size (MB)	Bandwidth (GB/s)	Bus type	Bus width (bit)
Radeon Xpress X1200	February 28, 2007	RS690C (zeus)	80	HT 2.0	350	400 – 800	4:2:4:4	1400	1400	1400	175	256 – 512	6.4 – 12.8	DDR2	128
Radeon Xpress X1250	August 29, 2006 (Intel), February 28, 2007 (AMD)	RS600, RS690 (zeus)	80	FSB, HT 2.0	400	400 – 800	4:2:4:4	1600	1600	1600	200	256 – 512	6.4 – 12.8	DDR2	128
Radeon Xpress 2100	March 4, 2008	RS740 (titan)	55	HT 2.0	500	400 – 800	4:2:4:4	2000	2000	2000	250	256 – 512	6.4 – 12.8	DDR2	128

=== Radeon X1000 series ===
Note that ATI X1000 series cards (e.g. X1900) do not have Vertex Texture Fetch, hence they do not fully comply with the VS 3.0 model. Instead, they offer a feature called "Render to Vertex Buffer (R2VB)" that provides functionality that is an alternative Vertex Texture Fetch.

Model	Launch	Code name	Fab (nm)	Transistors (million)	Die size (mm^{2})	Bus interface	Clock rate		Core config	Fillrate				Memory				TDP (Watts)	API support (version)		Release Price (USD)
Model	Launch	Code name	Fab (nm)	Transistors (million)	Die size (mm^{2})	Bus interface	Core (MHz)	Memory (MHz)	Core config	MOperations/s	MPixels/s	MVertices/s	MTexels/s	Size (MB)	Bandwidth (GB/s)	Bus type	Bus width (bit)	Max.	Direct3D	OpenGL	Release Price (USD)
Radeon X1300	October 5, 2005 (PCIe); December 1, 2005 (AGP)	RV515	90	107	100	AGP 8× PCI; PCIe ×16	450	250	4:2:4:4	1800	1800	225	1800	128; 256	8.0	DDR DDR2	128		9.0c	2.1	$99 (128MB) $129 (256 MB)
Radeon X1300 HyperMemory	October 5, 2005	RV515	90	107	100	PCIe ×16	450	250	4:2:4:4	1800	1800	225	1800	128; 256; 512	4.0	DDR2	64		9.0c	2.1	$
Radeon X1300 PRO	October 5, 2005 (PCIe); November 1, 2006 (AGP)	RV515	90	107	100	AGP 8× PCIe ×16	600	400	4:2:4:4	2400	2400	300	2400	128; 256	12.8	DDR2	128	31	9.0c	2.1	$149
Radeon X1300 XT	August 12, 2006	RV530	90	157	150	AGP 8× PCIe ×16	500	400	12:5:4:4	6000	2000	625	2000	128; 256	12.8	DDR2	128	22	9.0c	2.1	$89
Radeon X1550	January 8, 2007	RV516	90	107	100	AGP 8x PCI; PCIe x16	500	400	4:2:4:4	2200	2200	275	2200	128; 256; 512	6.4 12.8	DDR2	64 128	27	9.0c	2.1	$
Radeon X1600 PRO	October 10, 2005	RV530	90	157	150	AGP 8× PCIe ×16	500	390; 390–690	12:5:4:4	6000	2000	625	2000	128; 256; 512	12.48	DDR2; GDDR3	128	41	9.0c	2.1	$149 (128MB) $199 (256 MB)
Radeon X1600 XT	October 10, 2005 (PCIe)	RV530	90	157	150	AGP 8× PCIe ×16	590	690	12:5:4:4	7080	2360	737.5	2360	256; 512	22.08	GDDR3	128	42	9.0c	2.1	$249
Radeon X1650	February 1, 2007	RV530	90	157	150	AGP 8× PCIe ×16	500	400	12:5:4:4	6000	2000	625	2000	256; 512	12.8	DDR2	128		9.0c	2.1	$
Radeon X1650 SE		RV516	90	105		PCIe ×16	635	400	4:2:4:4					256	12.8	DDR2	128		9.0c	2.1	$
Radeon X1650 GT	May 1, 2007 (PCIe); October 1, 2007 (AGP)	RV560	80	330	230	AGP 8× PCIe x16	400	400	24:8:8:8	9600	3200	800	3200	256; 512	12.8	GDDR3	128		9.0c	2.1	$
Radeon X1650 PRO	August 23, 2006 (PCIe); October 15, 2006 (AGP)	RV535	80	330	131	AGP 8× PCIe x16	600	700	12:5:4:4	7200	2400	750	2400	256; 512	22.4	GDDR3	128	44	9.0c	2.1	$99
Radeon X1650 XT	October 30, 2006	RV560	80	330	230	AGP 8× PCIe x16	525	700	24:8:8:8	12600	4200	1050	4200	256; 512	22.4	GDDR3	128	55	9.0c	2.1	$149
Radeon X1700 FSC	November 5, 2007 (OEM)	RV535	80	330	131	PCIe ×16	587	695	12:5:4:4	7044	2348	733	2348	256	22.2	GDDR3	128	44	9.0c	2.1	OEM
Radeon X1700 SE	November 30, 2007	RV560	80	330	230	PCIe ×16	500	500	24:8:8:8	12000	4000	1000	4000	512	16.0	GDDR3	128	50	9.0c	2.1	$
Radeon X1800 CrossFire Edition	December 20, 2005	R520	90	321	288	PCIe ×16	600	700	16:8:16:16	9600	9600	900	9600	512	46.08	GDDR3	256	113	9.0c	2.1	$
Radeon X1800 GTO	March 9, 2006	R520	90	321	288	PCIe ×16	500	495	12:8:12:8	6000	6000	1000	6000	256; 512	32.0	GDDR3	256	48	9.0c	2.1	$249
Radeon X1800 XL	October 5, 2005	R520	90	321	288	PCIe ×16	500	500	16:8:16:16	8000	8000	1000	8000	256	32.0	GDDR3	256	70	9.0c	2.1	$449
Radeon X1800 XT	October 5, 2005	R520	90	321	288	PCIe ×16	625	750	16:8:16:16	10000	10000	1250	10000	256; 512	48.0	GDDR3	256	113	9.0c	2.1	$499 (256MB) $549 (512 MB)
Radeon X1900 CrossFire Edition	January 24, 2006	R580	90	384	352	PCIe ×16	625	725	48:8:16:16	30000	10000	1250	10000	512	46.4	GDDR3	256	100	9.0c	2.1	$599
Radeon X1900 GT	May 5, 2006	R580	90	384	352	PCIe ×16	575	600	36:8:12:12	20700	6900	1150	6900	256	38.4	GDDR3	256	75	9.0c	2.1	$
Radeon X1900 GT Rev. 2	September 7, 2006	R580	90	384	352	PCIe ×16	512	600	36:8:12:12	18432	6144	1024	6144	256	42.64	GDDR3	256		9.0c	2.1	$
Radeon X1900 XT	January 24, 2006	R580	90	384	352	PCIe ×16	625	725	48:8:16:16	30000	10000	1250	10000	256; 512	46.4	GDDR3	256	100	9.0c	2.1	$549
Radeon X1900 XTX	January 24, 2006	R580	90	384	352	PCIe ×16	650	775	48:8:16:16	31200	10400	1300	10400	512	49.6	GDDR3	256	135	9.0c	2.1	$649
Radeon X1950 CrossFire Edition	August 23, 2006	R580+	80	384	352	PCIe ×16	650	1000	48:8:16:16	31200	10400	1300	10400	512	64	GDDR4	256		9.0c	2.1	$449
Radeon X1950 GT	January 29, 2007 (PCIe); February 10, 2007 (AGP)	RV570	80	330	230	AGP 8x PCIe x16	500	600	36:8:12:12	18000	6000	1000	6000	256; 512	38.4	GDDR3	256	57	9.0c	2.1	$140
Radeon X1950 PRO	October 17, 2006 (PCIe); October 25, 2006 (AGP)	RV570	80	330	230	AGP 8x PCIe x16	575	690	36:8:12:12	20700	6900	1150	6900	256; 512	44.16	GDDR3	256	66	9.0c	2.1	$199
Radeon X1950 XT	October 17, 2006 (PCIe); February 18, 2007 (AGP)	R580+	80	384	352	AGP 8x PCIe 1.0 x16	625	700 (AGP); 900 (PCIe)	48:8:16:16	30000	10000	1250	10000	256; 512	44.8 (AGP); 57.6 (PCIe)	GDDR3	256	96	9.0c	2.1	$
Radeon X1950 XTX	October 17, 2006	R580+	80	384	352	PCIe 1.0 ×16	650	1000	48:8:16:16	31200	10400	1300	10400	512	64	GDDR4	256	125	9.0c	2.1	$449
Model	Launch	Code name	Fab (nm)	Transistors (million)	Die size (mm^{2})	Bus interface	Core (MHz)	Memory (MHz)	Core config	MOperations/s	MPixels/s	MVertices/s	MTexels/s	Size (MB)	Bandwidth (GB/s)	Bus type	Bus width (bit)	Max.	Direct3D	OpenGL	Release price (USD)
Model	Launch	Code name	Fab (nm)	Transistors (million)	Die size (mm^{2})	Bus interface	Clock rate		Core config	Fillrate				Memory				TDP (Watts)	API support (version)		Release price (USD)

^{1} Pixel shaders : Vertex shaders : Texture mapping units : Render output units

=== Radeon HD 2000 series ===
Model	Launch	Code name	Fab (nm)	Transistors (million)	Die size (mm^{2})	Bus interface	Clock rate		Core config	Fillrate		Memory				Processing power (GFLOPS)		TDP (Watts)	Crossfire support	API support (version)			Release price (USD)
Model	Launch	Code name	Fab (nm)	Transistors (million)	Die size (mm^{2})	Bus interface	Core (MHz)	Memory (MHz)	Core config	Pixel (GP/s)	Texture (GT/s)	Size (MB)	Bandwidth (GB/s)	Bus type	Bus width (Bit)	Single precision	Double precision	Max.	Crossfire support	Direct3D	OpenGL	OpenCL	Release price (USD)
Radeon HD 2350	June 28, 2007	RV610	65	180	85	PCIe 1.0 ×16	525	400	40:4:4	2.10	2.10	64 onboard + up to 256 system	3.20	DDR2	32	42.0	—N/a	20	No	10.0	3.3	APP Stream Only	?
Radeon HD 2400 PRO	June 28, 2007	RV610	65	180	85	PCIe 1.0 ×16; AGP; PCI	525	400	40:4:4	2.10	2.10	128; 256; 512	6.40	DDR2	64	42.0	—N/a	20	No	10.0	3.3	APP Stream Only	$50–55
Radeon HD 2400 XT	June 28, 2007	RV610	65	180	85	PCIe 1.0 ×16	650	500; 700	40:4:4	2.60	2.60	256	8.0; 11.2	DDR2; GDDR3	64	52.0	—N/a	25	No	10.0	3.3	APP Stream Only	$75–85
Radeon HD 2600 PRO	June 28, 2007	RV630	65	390	153	PCIe 1.0 ×16; AGP	600	500; 700	120:8:4	2.40	4.80	256; 512	16.0; 22.4	DDR2; GDDR3	128	144.0	—N/a	35	No	10.0	3.3	APP Stream Only	$89–99
Radeon HD 2600 XT	June 28, 2007	RV630	65	390	153	PCIe 1.0 ×16; AGP	800	800; 1100	120:8:4	3.20	6.40	256; 512	25.6; 35.2	GDDR3; GDDR4	128	192.0	—N/a	45; 50	4-way CrossFire	10.0	3.3	APP Stream Only	$119 (GDDR3) $149 (GDDR4)
Radeon HD 2900 GT	November 6, 2007	R600 GT	80	720	420	PCIe 1.0 ×16	601	800	240:12:12	7.21	7.21	256; 512	51.2	GDDR3	256	288.5	—N/a	150	4-way CrossFire	10.0	3.3	APP Stream Only	$200
Radeon HD 2900 PRO	September 25, 2007	R600 PRO	80	720	420	PCIe 1.0 ×16	600	800; 925	320:16:16	9.6	9.6	512; 1024	51.2; 102.4; 118.4	GDDR3; GDDR4	256; 512	384.0	—N/a	200	4-way CrossFire	10.0	3.3	APP Stream Only	$250 (GDDR3) $300 (GDDR4)
Radeon HD 2900 XT	May 14, 2007	R600 XT	80	720	420	PCIe 1.0 ×16	743	828; 1000	320:16:16	11.9	11.9	512; 1024	105.6; 128.0	GDDR3; GDDR4	512	475.5	—N/a	215	4-way CrossFire	10.0	3.3	APP Stream Only	$399

=== Radeon HD 3000 series ===
Model	Launch	Code name	Fab (nm)	Transistors (million)	Die size (mm^{2})	Bus interface	Clock rate		Core config	Fillrate		Memory				Processing power (GFLOPS)		TDP (Watts)	Crossfire Support	API support (version)			Release price (USD)
Model	Launch	Code name	Fab (nm)	Transistors (million)	Die size (mm^{2})	Bus interface	Core (MHz)	Memory (MHz)	Core config	Pixel (GP/s)	Texture (GT/s)	Size (MB)	Bandwidth (GB/s)	Bus type	Bus width (Bit)	Single precision	Double precision	Max.	Crossfire Support	Direct3D	OpenGL	OpenCL, ATI Stream	Release price (USD)
Radeon HD 3410	May 7, 2009	RV610	65	180	85	PCIe 1.0 ×16	519	396	40:4:4	2.08	2.08	256	6.34	DDR2	64	41.52	—N/a	20	No	10.0	3.3	No, Yes	?
Radeon HD 3450	January 23, 2008	RV620 LE	55	181	67	PCIe 2.0 ×16; PCI; AGP 8×	600	500	40:4:4	2.40	2.40	256; 512	8.00	DDR2	64	48.0	—N/a	25	No	10.1	3.3	No, Yes	?
Radeon HD 3470	January 23, 2008	RV620 PRO	55	181	67	PCIe 2.0 ×16	800	950	40:4:4	3.20	3.20	256; 512	15.2	DDR2; GDDR3	64	64.0	—N/a	30	No	10.1	3.3	No, Yes	?
Radeon HD 3550	August 4, 2008	RV620 PRO	55	181	67	PCIe 2.0 ×16	594	396	40:4:4	2.38	2.38	512	6.34	DDR2	64	47.52	—N/a	30	No	10.1	3.3	No, Yes	?
Radeon HD 3570	July 5, 2010	RV620 PRO	55	181	67	PCIe 2.0 ×16	796	495	40:4:4	3.18	3.18	512	7.92	DDR2	64	63.68	—N/a	30	No	10.1	3.3	No, Yes	?
Radeon HD 3610	September 24, 2009	RV630 PRO	65	390	153	PCIe 1.0 ×16	594	396	120:8:4	2.38	4.75	512; 1024	12.7	DDR2	128	142.6	—N/a	35	No	10.1	3.3	No, Yes	?
Radeon HD 3650	January 23, 2008	RV635 PRO	55	378	153	PCIe 2.0 ×16; AGP 8×	725	405; 800	120:8:4	2.90	5.80	256; 512; 1024	13.0; 25.6	DDR2; GDDR3; GDDR4	128	174.0	—N/a	65	2-way CrossFire	10.1	3.3	No, Yes	?
Radeon HD 3730	October 5, 2008	RV635 PRO	55	378	135	PCIe 2.0 ×16	722	405	120:8:4	2.89	5.78	512; 1024	13.0	DDR2	128	173.3	—N/a	65	No	10.1	3.3	No, Yes	?
Radeon HD 3750	October 5, 2008	RV635 PRO	55	378	135	PCIe 2.0 ×16	796	693	120:8:4	3.18	6.37	512	22.2	GDDR3	128	191.0	—N/a	65	2-way CrossFire	10.1	3.3	No, Yes	?
Radeon HD 3830	April 1, 2008	RV670 PRO	55	666	192	PCIe 2.0 ×16	668	828	320:16:16	10.7	10.7	256	26.5	GDDR3	128	427.5	85.4	75	2-way CrossFire	10.1	3.3	No, Yes	$129
Radeon HD 3850	November 19, 2007	RV670 PRO	55	666	192	PCIe 2.0 x16 AGP 8x	668	830; 900	320:16:16	10.7	10.7	256; 512; 1024	53.1; 57.6	GDDR3; GDDR4	256	427.5	85.4	75	4-way CrossFire	10.1	3.3	No, Yes	$179
Radeon HD 3870	November 19, 2007	RV670 XT	55	666	192	PCIe 2.0 x16 AGP 8x	777	900; 1126	320:16:16	12.4	12.4	512; 1024	57.6; 72.1	GDDR3; GDDR4	256	497.3	99.2	106	4-way CrossFire	10.1	3.3	No, Yes	$219
Radeon HD 3850 X2	April 4, 2008	RV670 PRO	55	666×2	192×2	PCIe 2.0 ×16	668	828	320:16:16×2	10.7×2	10.7×2	512×2	53.0×2	GDDR3	256×2	428.2×2	85.6×2	140	2-way CrossFire	10.1	3.3	No, Yes	$349
Radeon HD 3870 X2	January 28, 2008	R680	55	666×2	192×2	PCIe 2.0 ×16	825	901; 1125	320:16:16×2	13.2×2	13.2×2	512×2	57.6×2; 72.1×2	GDDR3; GDDR4	256×2	528.0×2	105.6×2	165	2-way CrossFire	10.1	3.3	No, Yes	$449

==== IGP (HD 3000) ====
- All Radeon HD 3000 IGP models support Direct3D 10.0 and OpenGL 3.3

Model	Launch	Code name	Graphics core	Fab (nm)	Transistors (million)	Die size (mm^{2})	Bus interface	Core clock^{2} (MHz)	Core config^{1}	Fillrate			Memory^{3}					Processing power (GFLOPS)	Features / Notes
Model	Launch	Code name	Graphics core	Fab (nm)	Transistors (million)	Die size (mm^{2})	Bus interface	Core clock^{2} (MHz)	Core config^{1}	Pixel (GP/s)	Texture (GT/s)	FP32 (GP/s)	Size (MB)	Bandwidth (GB/s)	Bus type	Effective clock (MHz)	Bus width (Bit)	Processing power (GFLOPS)	Features / Notes
Radeon 3000 Graphics (760G Chipset)	2009	RS780L	RV610	55	205	~73 (~9 × 8.05)	HT 3.0	350	40:4:4	1.4	1.4	0.7	Up to 512 system	20.8 (system)	HT (system)	—N/a	—N/a	28	AVIVO
Radeon 3100 Graphics (780V Chipset)	2008; Jan 23 (China); Mar 4 (worldwide)	RS780C	RV610	55	205	~73 (~9 × 8.05)	HT 3.0	350	40:4:4	1.4	1.4	0.7	Up to 512 system	20.8 (system)	HT (system)	—N/a	—N/a	28	AVIVO
Radeon HD 3200 Graphics (780G Chipset)	2008; Jan 23 (China); Mar 4 (worldwide)	RS780	RV610	55	205	~73 (~9 × 8.05)	HT 3.0	500	40:4:4	2	2	1	Up to 512 system + optional 128 sideport	20.8 (system) + 2.6 (sideport)	HT (system) + DDR2-1066 DDR3-1333 (sideport)	1333 (sideport)	16 (sideport)	40	UVD+, 8× AA (wide-tent CFAA)
Radeon HD 3300 Graphics (790GX Chipset)	Jul 2008	RS780D	RV610	55	205	~73 (~9 × 8.05)	HT 3.0	700	40:4:4	2.8	2.8	1.4	Up to 512 system + 128 sideport	20.8 (system) + 2.6 (sideport)	HT (system) + DDR3-1333 (sideport)	1333 (sideport)	16 (sideport)	56	UVD+, PowerPlay

^{1} Unified shaders : Texture mapping units : Render output units
^{2} The clock frequencies may vary in different usage scenarios, as AMD PowerPlay technology is implemented. The clock frequencies listed here refer to the officially announced clock specifications.
^{3} The sideport is a dedicated memory bus. It is preferably used for a frame buffer.

=== All-in-Wonder series ===
Model	Launch	Code name	Fab (nm)	Bus interface	Core clock (MHz)	Memory clock (MHz)	Core config^{1}	Fillrate			Memory				Performance (GFLOPS)	TDP (Watts)	API (version)	
Model	Launch	Code name	Fab (nm)	Bus interface	Core clock (MHz)	Memory clock (MHz)	Core config^{1}	MPixels/s	MTexels/s	MVertices/s	Size (MB)	Bandwidth (GB/s)	Bus type	Bus width (bit)	Performance (GFLOPS)	TDP (Watts)	Direct3D	OpenGL
All-in-Wonder 128	January 25, 1999	Rage 4	250	AGP PCI	90	90	2:0:2:2	?	?	?	16	1.44	SDR	128	?	5	6	1.2
All-in-Wonder VE	December 2, 2002	RV100	180	PCI	183	183	1:0:3:1	183	549	0	64	2.9	DDR	64	?	10	7.0	1.3
All-in-Wonder Radeon	July 31, 2000	R100	180	AGP 4×	166	166	2:1:6:2	332	996	41.5	32	5.312	DDR	128	?	13	7.0	1.3
All-in-Wonder 7500	January 22, 2002	RV200	150	AGP 4×	260	180	2:1:6:2	520	1560	65	64	5.760	DDR	128	?	?	7.0	1.3
All-in-Wonder 8500	April 4, 2002	R200	150	AGP 4×	260	275	4:2:8:4	1100	2200	137.5	128	8.8	DDR	128	?	31	8.1	1.4
All-in-Wonder 8500 DV	August 30, 2001	R200	150	AGP 4×	230	190	4:2:8:4	920	1840	115	64	6.08	DDR	128	?	31	8.1	1.4
All-in-Wonder 9000 Pro	March 31, 2003	RV250	150	AGP 8x	275	225	4:1:4:4	1110	1110	68.75	64, 128	7.2	DDR	128	?	?	8.1	1.4
All-in-Wonder 9200	January 26, 2004	RV250	150	AGP 8x	250	200	4:1:4:4	1000	1000	62.5	128	6.4	DDR	128	?	?	8.1	1.4
All-in-Wonder 9200 SE	N/A	RV250	150	AGP 8x	250	166	4:1:4:4	1000	1000	62.5	128	2.656	DDR	64	?	?	8.1	1.4
All-in-Wonder 9600	January 26, 2004	RV350	130	AGP 8x	325	400	4:2:4:4	1300	1300	162.5	128	6.4	DDR	128	?	17	9.0	2.0
All-in-Wonder 9600 Pro	August 5, 2003	RV350	130	AGP 8x	400	650	4:2:4:4	1600	1600	200	128	10.4	DDR	128	?	19	9.0	2.0
All-in-Wonder 9600 XT	January 26, 2004	RV350	130	AGP 8x	525	650	4:2:4:4	2100	2100	262.5	128	10.4	DDR	128	?	20	9.0	2.0
All-in-Wonder 9700 Pro	December 30, 2002	R300	150	AGP 8x	325	620	8:4:8:8	2600	2600	325	128	19.84	DDR	256	?	50	9.0	2.0
All-in-Wonder 9800 Pro	April 7, 2003	R350	150	AGP 8x	380	680	8:4:8:8	3040	3040	380	128	21.76	DDR	256	?	52	9.0	2.0
All-in-Wonder 9800 SE	November 1, 2003	R350	150	AGP 8x	380	680	4:4:4:8	3040	1520	380	128	10.88	DDR	128	?	39	9.0	2.0
All-in-Wonder X600 Pro	September 21, 2004	RV370	110	AGP 8x	400	600	4:2:4:4	1600	1600	200	AGP 128, PCIe 256	9.6	DDR	128	?	30	9.0	2.0
All-in-Wonder X800 GT	August 8, 2005	R430	110	PCIe ×16	490	980	8:6:8:16	6400	3200	600	128	31.36	GDDR3	256	?	35	9.0b	2.0
All-in-Wonder X800 XL	July 5, 2005	R430	110	PCIe ×16; AGP 8×	400	980	16:6:16:16	6400	6400	600	256	31.36	GDDR3	256	?	57	9.0b	2.0
All-in-Wonder X800 XT	September 9, 2004	R420	130	AGP 8×	500	1000	16:6:16:16	8000	8000	750	256	32	GDDR3	256	?	81	9.0b	2.0
All-in-Wonder 2006	December 22, 2005	RV515	90	PCIe ×16	450	800	4:2:4:4	1800	1800	225	256	12.8	DDR2	128	?	23	9.0c	2.0
All-in-Wonder X1800 XL	November 21, 2005	R520	90	PCIe ×16	500	1000	16:8:16:16	8000	8000	1000	256	32	GDDR3	256	?	78	9.0c	2.0
All-in-Wonder X1900	January 24, 2006	R580	90	PCIe ×16	500	960	48:8:16:16	8000	8000	1000	256	30.72	GDDR3	256	?	91	9.0c	2.0
All-in-Wonder HD 3650	June 28, 2008	RV635	55	PCIe ×16	725	1200	120:8:4	2900	5800	N/A	512	19.2	DDR2	128	174.0	26	10.1	3.3

^{1} Pixel shaders : Vertex shaders : Texture mapping units : Render output units
^{2} Unified shaders : Texture mapping units : Render output units

=== Radeon HD 4000 series ===
Model^{4}	Launch	Code name	Fab (nm)	Transistors (million)	Die size (mm^{2})	Bus interface	Clock rate		Core config^{1}	Fillrate		Memory^{2}				Processing power (GFLOPS)		TDP^{3} (Watts)		Crossfire support	API support (version)			Release price (USD)
Model^{4}	Launch	Code name	Fab (nm)	Transistors (million)	Die size (mm^{2})	Bus interface	Core (MHz)	Memory (MHz)	Core config^{1}	Pixel (GP/s)	Texture (GT/s)	Size (MB)	Bandwidth (GB/s)	Bus type	Bus width (bit)	Single precision	Double precision	Idle	Max.	Crossfire support	Direct3D	OpenGL	OpenCL	Release price (USD)
Radeon HD 4350	September 30, 2008	RV710	55	242	73	PCIe 2.0 ×16; PCIe 2.0 ×1; AGP 8×	600	400; 650	80:8:4	2.40	4.80	256; 512; 1024	6.40; 10.4	DDR2; DDR3	64	92.0	No		20	No	10.1	3.3	1.0	?
Radeon HD 4550	September 30, 2008	RV710	55	242	73	PCIe 2.0 ×16	600	655; 800	80:8:4	2.40	4.80	256; 512; 1024	10.5; 12.8	DDR2; DDR3	64	96.0	No		25	No	10.1	3.3	1.0	?
Radeon HD 4570	November 25, 2008	RV710	55	242	73	PCIe 2.0 ×16	650	500	80:8:4	2.60	5.20	1024	8.00	DDR2	64	104.0	No		25	No	10.1	3.3	1.0	?
Radeon HD 4580	November 20, 2011	RV635 PRO	55	378	135	PCIe 2.0 ×16	796	693	120:8:4	3.18	6.37	512	22.2	GDDR3	128	191.0	No		65	No	10.1	3.3	1.0	?
Radeon HD 4650	September 10, 2008	RV730 PRO	55	514	146	PCIe 2.0 ×16; AGP 8×	600; 650	400 – 500; 500; 700	320:32:8	4.80; 5.20	19.2; 20.8	256; 512; 1024	12.8 - 16.0; 16.0; 22.4	DDR2; GDDR3; GDDR4	64; 128	384.0; 416.0	No		48	2-way Crossfire	10.1	3.3	1.0	?
Radeon HD 4670	September 10, 2008	RV730 XT	55	514	146	PCIe 2.0 ×16; AGP 8×	750	400 – 500; 900; 1000	320:32:8	6.00	24.0	512; 1024	12.8 – 16.0; 28.8; 32.0	DDR2; GDDR3; GDDR4	128	480.0	No		59	2-way Crossfire	10.1	3.3	1.0	$79
Radeon HD 4730	June 8, 2009	RV770 CE	55	956	256	PCIe 2.0 ×16	700; 750	900	640:32:8	5.60; 6.00	22.4; 24.0	512	57.6	GDDR5	128	896.0; 960.0	179.2; 192.0		110	2-way Crossfire	10.1	3.3	1.0	?
Radeon HD 4750	September 9, 2009	RV740	40	826	137	PCIe 2.0 ×16	730	800	640:32:16	11.7	23.4	512	51.2	GDDR5	128	934.4			80	2-way Crossfire	10.1	3.3	1.0	?
Radeon HD 4770	April 28, 2009	RV740	40	826	137	PCIe 2.0 ×16	750	800	640:32:16	12.0	24.0	512	51.2	GDDR5	128	960.0	192.0		80	2-way Crossfire	10.1	3.3	1.0	$109
Radeon HD 4810	May 28, 2009	RV770 CE	55	956	256	PCIe 2.0 ×16	625; 750	900	640:32:8	5.00; 6.00	20.0; 24.0	512	57.6	GDDR5	128	800.0; 960.0	160.0; 192.0		95	2-way Crossfire	10.1	3.3	1.0	?
Radeon HD 4830	October 21, 2008	RV770 LE	55	956	256	PCIe 2.0 ×16	575	900	640:32:16	9.20	18.4	512; 1024	57.6	GDDR3; GDDR4	256	736.0	147.2		95	2-way Crossfire	10.1	3.3	1.0	$130
Radeon HD 4850	June 25, 2008	RV770 PRO	55	956	256	PCIe 2.0 ×16	625	993	800:40:16	10.0	25.0	512; 1024; 2048	63.55	GDDR3; GDDR4; GDDR5	256	1000	200.0		110	4-way Crossfire	10.1	3.3	1.0	$199
Radeon HD 4860	September 9, 2009	RV790 GT	55	959	282	PCIe 2.0 ×16	700	750	640:32:16	11.2	22.4	512; 1024	96	GDDR5	256	896.0	179.2		130	4-way Crossfire	10.1	3.3	1.0	?
Radeon HD 4870	June 25, 2008	RV770 XT	55	956	256	PCIe 2.0 ×16	750	900	800:40:16	12.0	30.0	512; 1024; 2048	115.2	GDDR5	256	1200	240.0		150	4-way Crossfire	10.1	3.3	1.0	$299
Radeon HD 4890	April 2, 2009	RV790 XT	55	959	282	PCIe 2.0 ×16	850	975	800:40:16	13.6	34.0	1024; 2048	124.8	GDDR5	256	1360	272.0		190	4-way Crossfire	10.1	3.3	1.0	$249
Radeon HD 4850 X2	November 7, 2008	R700 (2xRV770 PRO)	55	956×2	256×2	PCIe 2.0 ×16	625	995	800:40:16×2	10.0×2	25.0×2	512×2; 1024×2	63.7×2	GDDR3	256×2	2000	400.0		250	2-way Crossfire	10.1	3.3	1.0	$339
Radeon HD 4870 X2	August 12, 2008	R700 (2xRV770 XT)	55	956×2	256×2	PCIe 2.0 ×16	750	900	800:40:16×2	12×2	30×2	1024×2	115.2×2	GDDR5	256×2	2400	480.0		286	2-way Crossfire	10.1	3.3	1.0	$449
Model^{4}	Launch	Code name	Fab (nm)	Transistors (million)	Die size (mm^{2})	Bus interface	Clock rate		Core config^{1}	Fillrate		Memory^{2}				Processing power (GFLOPS)		TDP^{3} (Watts)		Crossfire support	API support (version)			Release price (USD)
Model^{4}	Launch	Code name	Fab (nm)	Transistors (million)	Die size (mm^{2})	Bus interface	Core (MHz)	Memory (MHz)	Core config^{1}	Pixel (GP/s)	Texture (GT/s)	Size (MB)	Bandwidth (GB/s)	Bus type	Bus width (bit)	Single precision	Double precision	Idle	Max.	Crossfire support	Direct3D	OpenGL	OpenCL	Release price (USD)

^{1} Unified shaders : Texture mapping units : Render output units
^{2} The effective data transfer rate of GDDR5 is quadruple its nominal clock, instead of double as it is with other DDR memory.
^{3} The TDP is reference design TDP values from AMD. Different non-reference board designs from vendors may lead to slight variations in actual TDP.
^{4} All models feature UVD2 and PowerPlay.

==== IGP (HD 4000) ====
- All Radeon HD 4000 IGP models support Direct3D 10.1 and OpenGL 2.0

Model	Launch	Code name	Graphics core	Fab (nm)	Transistors (million)	Die size (mm^{2})	Bus interface	Core		Fillrate			Memory^{3}					Processing power (GFLOPS)	Features / Notes
Model	Launch	Code name	Graphics core	Fab (nm)	Transistors (million)	Die size (mm^{2})	Bus interface	Config^{1}	Clock^{2} (MHz)	Pixel (GP/s)	Texture (GT/s)	FP32 (GP/s)	Size (MB)	Bandwidth (GB/s)	Bus type	Effective clock (MHz)	Bus width (Bit)	Processing power (GFLOPS)	Features / Notes
Radeon HD 4200 Graphics (785G Chipset)	Aug 2009	RS880	RV620	55	>205	~73 (~9 × 8.05)	HT 3.0	40:4:4	500	2	2	1	Up to 512 system + optional 128 sideport	20.8 (system) + 2.6 (sideport)	HT (system) + DDR2-1066 DDR3-1333 (sideport)	1333 (sideport)	16 (sideport)	40	UVD2
Radeon HD 4250 Graphics (880G Chipset)	Mar 2010	RS880	RV620	55	>205	~73 (~9 × 8.05)	HT 3.0	40:4:4	560	2.24	2.24	1.12	Up to 512 system + optional 128 sideport	20.8 (system) + 2.6 (sideport)	HT (system) + DDR3-1333 (sideport)	1333 (sideport)	16 (sideport)	44.8	UVD2
Radeon HD 4290 Graphics (890GX Chipset)	Mar 2010	RS880D	RV620	55	>205	~73 (~9 × 8.05)	HT 3.0	40:4:4	700	2.8	2.8	1.4	Up to 512 system + 128 sideport	20.8 (system) + 2.6 (sideport)	HT (system) + DDR3-1333 (sideport)	1333 (sideport)	16 (sideport)	56	UVD2

^{1} Unified shaders : Texture mapping units : Render output units
^{2} The clock frequencies may vary in different usage scenarios, as ATI PowerPlay technology is implemented. The clock frequencies listed here refer to the officially announced clock specifications.
^{3} The sideport is a dedicated memory bus. It preferably used for frame buffer.

=== Radeon HD 5000 series ===
- The HD5000 series is the last series of AMD GPUs which supports two analog CRT-monitors with a single graphics card (i.e. with two RAM-DACs).
- AMD Eyefinity introduced.

Model	Launch	Code name	Fab (nm)	Transistors (million)	Die size (mm^{2})	Bus interface	Clock rate		Core config (Note: Unified shaders : Texture mapping units : Render output units)	Fillrate		Memory				Processing power (GFLOPS)		TDP (Watts) (Note: The TDP is reference design TDP values from AMD. Different non-reference board designs from vendors may lead to slight variations in actual TDP.)		CrossFire support	API support (version)			Release price (USD)
Model	Launch	Code name	Fab (nm)	Transistors (million)	Die size (mm^{2})	Bus interface	Core (MHz)	Memory (MHz)	Core config	Pixel (GP/s)	Texture (GT/s)	Size (MB)	Bandwidth (GB/s)	Bus type	Bus width (Bit)	Single precision	Double precision	Idle	Max.	CrossFire support	Direct3D	OpenGL	OpenCL	Release price (USD)
Radeon HD 5450	Feb 4, 2010	Cedar	40	292	59	PCIe 2.1 x16 PCI; PCIe 2.1 x1	650; 650; 650	400; 800; 800	80:8:4	2.6	5.2	512; 1024; 2048	6.4; 12.8	DDR2; DDR3	64	104	—N/a	6.4	19.1	No	11.3 (11 0)	4.5	1.2	~50
Radeon HD 5550	Feb 9, 2010	Redwood LE	40	627	104	PCIe 2.1 x16	550; 550; 550	400; 800; 800	320:16:8	4.4	8.8	512; 1024; 2048	12.8; 25.6; 51.2	DDR2; GDDR3; GDDR5	128	352	—N/a	10	39	No	11.3 (11 0)	4.5	1.2	~70
Radeon HD 5570	Feb 9, 2010	Redwood PRO	40	627	104	PCIe 2.1 x16	650; 650	400; 900	400:20:8	5.2	13.0	512; 1024; 2048	12.8; 28.8; 57.6	DDR2; GDDR3; GDDR5	128	520	—N/a	10	39	No	11.3 (11 0)	4.5	1.2	80
Radeon HD 5610	May 14, 2011	Redwood PRO	40	627	104	PCIe 2.1 x16	650	500	400:20:8	5.2	13.0	1024	16.0	GDDR3	128	520	—N/a	?	39	No	11.3 (11 0)	4.5	1.2	?
Radeon HD 5670	Jan 14, 2010	Redwood XT	40	627	104	PCIe 2.1 x16	775; 775	800; 1000	400:20:8	6.2	15.5	512; 1024; 2048	25.6; 64.0	GDDR3; GDDR5	128	620	—N/a	15	64	4-way CrossFire	11.3 (11 0)	4.5	1.2	99
Radeon HD 5750	Oct 13, 2009	Juniper PRO	40	1040	170	PCIe 2.1 x16	700; 700	1150; 1150	720:36:16	11.2	25.2	512; 1024	73.6	GDDR5	128	1008	—N/a	16	86	4-way CrossFire	11.3 (11 0)	4.5	1.2	129
Radeon HD 5770	Oct 13, 2009	Juniper XT	40	1040	170	PCIe 2.1 x16	850; 850	1200; 1200	800:40:16	13.6	34.0	512; 1024	76.8	GDDR5	128	1360	—N/a	18	108	4-way CrossFire	11.3 (11 0)	4.5	1.2	159
Radeon HD 5830	Feb 25, 2010	Cypress LE	40	2154	334	PCIe 2.1 x16	800	1000	1120:56:16	12.8	44.8	1024	128.0	GDDR5	256	1792	358.4	25	175	4-way CrossFire	11.3 (11 0)	4.5	1.2	239
Radeon HD 5850	Sep 30, 2009	Cypress PRO	40	2154	334	PCIe 2.1 x16	725; 725	1000; 1000	1440:72:32	23.2	52.2	1024; 2048	128.0	GDDR5	256	2088	417.6	27	151	4-way CrossFire	11.3 (11 0)	4.5	1.2	259
Radeon HD 5870	Sep 23, 2009	Cypress XT	40	2154	334	PCIe 2.1 x16	850; 850	1200; 1200	1600:80:32	27.2	68.0	1024; 2048	153.6	GDDR5	256	2720	544	27	188; 228	4-way CrossFire	11.3 (11 0)	4.5	1.2	379
Radeon HD 5870 Eyefinity Edition (Note: All chips feature AMD Eyefinity, but the Radeon HD 5870 Eyefinity Edition card also have six mini DisplayPort outputs, all of which can be simultaneously active.)	Mar 11, 2010	Cypress XT	40	2154	334	PCIe 2.1 x16	850	1200	1600:80:32	27.2	68.0	2048	153.6	GDDR5	256	2720	544	27	228	4-way CrossFire	11.3 (11 0)	4.5	1.2	479
Radeon HD 5970	Nov 18, 2009	Hemlock	40	2154×2	334×2	PCIe 2.1 x16	725; 725	1000; 1000	1600:80:32×2	46.4	116.0	1024×2; 2048×2	128×2	GDDR5	256×2	4640	928	51	294	2-way CrossFire	11.3 (11 0)	4.5	1.2	599

=== Radeon HD 6000 series ===
• The Radeon HD 6000 series has a new tesselation engine which is said to double the performance when working with tesselation compared to the previous HD 5000 series.

Model (Codename)	Release Date & Price	Architecture & Fab	Transistors & Die Size	Core		Fillrate (Note: Texture fillrate is calculated as the number of Texture Mapping Units multiplied by the base (or boost) core clock speed.) (Note: Pixel fillrate is calculated as the number of Render Output Units multiplied by the base (or boost) core clock speed.)		Processing power (Note: Precision performance is calculated from the base (or boost) core clock speed based on a FMA operation.) (GFLOPS)		Memory (Note: The effective data transfer rate of GDDR5 is quadruple its nominal clock, instead of double as it is with DDR memory.)				TDP (Watts)		Bus interface
Model (Codename)	Release Date & Price	Architecture & Fab	Transistors & Die Size	Config (Note: Unified Shaders : Texture Mapping Units : Render Output Units)	Clock (MHz)	Texture (GT/s)	Pixel (GP/s)	Single	Double	Size (MB)	Bus type & width	Clock (MHz)	Bandwidth (GB/s)	Idle	Max	Bus interface
Radeon HD 6350 (Cedar)	April 7, 2011 $23 USD	TeraScale 2; 40 nm	292×10^{6} 59 mm^{2}	80:8:4	650	5.2	2.6	104	—N/a	512	DDR3; 64-bit	800	12.8	6.4	19.1	PCIe 2.1 ×16
Radeon HD 6450 (Caicos)	February 7, 2011; OEM	TeraScale 2; 40 nm	370×10^{6} 67 mm^{2}	160:8:4	625; 750	5.0; 6.0	2.5; 3.0	200; 240	—N/a	512	DDR3; 64-bit	533; 800	8.5; 12.8	9	18; 27	PCIe 2.1 ×16
Radeon HD 6450 (Caicos)	April 7, 2011 $55 USD	TeraScale 2; 40 nm	370×10^{6} 67 mm^{2}	160:8:4	625; 750	5.0; 6.0	2.5; 3.0	200; 240	—N/a	512; 1024; 2048	DDR3; 64-bit	800; 900	12.8; 14.4	9	18; 27	PCIe 2.1 ×16
Radeon HD 6570 (Turks Pro)	February 7, 2011; OEM	TeraScale 2; 40 nm	716×10^{6} 118 mm^{2}	480:24:8	650	15.6	5.2	624	—N/a	1024	DDR3; 128-bit	900	28.8	10	44	PCIe 2.1 ×16
Radeon HD 6570 (Turks Pro)	April 19, 2011 $79 USD	TeraScale 2; 40 nm	716×10^{6} 118 mm^{2}	480:24:8	650	15.6	5.2	624	—N/a	2048; 4096	DDR3; GDDR5; 128-bit	667; 1000	21.3; 64	11	60	PCIe 2.1 ×16
Radeon HD 6670 (Turks XT)	April 19, 2011 $99 USD	TeraScale 2; 40 nm	716×10^{6} 118 mm^{2}	480:24:8	800	19.2	6.4	768	—N/a	512; 1024; 2048	DDR3; GDDR5; 128-bit	800; 1000	25.6; 64	12	66	PCIe 2.1 ×16
Radeon HD 6750 (Juniper Pro)	January 21, 2011; OEM	TeraScale 2; 40 nm	1040×10^{6} 166 mm^{2}	720:36:16	700	25.2	11.2	1008	—N/a	512; 1024	GDDR5; 128-bit	1150	73.6	16	86	PCIe 2.1 ×16
Radeon HD 6770 (Juniper XT)	April 19, 2011 ?	TeraScale 2; 40 nm	1040×10^{6} 166 mm^{2}	800:40:16	850	34.0	13.6	1360	—N/a	512; 1024	GDDR5; 128-bit	1200; 1050	76.8; 67.2	18	108	PCIe 2.1 ×16
Radeon HD 6790 (Barts LE)	April 4, 2011 $149 USD	TeraScale 2; 40 nm	1700×10^{6} 255 mm^{2}	800:40:16	840	33.6	13.4	1344	—N/a	1024	GDDR5; 256-bit	1050	134.4	19	150	PCIe 2.1 ×16
Radeon HD 6850 (Barts Pro)	October 22, 2010 $179 USD	TeraScale 2; 40 nm	1700×10^{6} 255 mm^{2}	960:48:32	775	37.2	24.8	1488	—N/a	1024	GDDR5; 256-bit	1000	128	19	127	PCIe 2.1 ×16
Radeon HD 6870 (Barts XT)	October 22, 2010 $239 USD	TeraScale 2; 40 nm	1700×10^{6} 255 mm^{2}	1120:56:32	900	50.4	28.8	2016	—N/a	1024; 2048	GDDR5; 256-bit	1050	134.4	19	151	PCIe 2.1 ×16
Radeon HD 6930 (Cayman CE)	December 2011 $180 USD	TeraScale 3; 40 nm	2640×10^{6} 389 mm^{2}	1280:80:32	750	60.0	24.0	1920	480	1024; 2048	GDDR5; 256-bit	1200	153.6	18	186	PCIe 2.1 ×16
Radeon HD 6950 (Cayman Pro)	December 15, 2010 $259 USD $299 USD	TeraScale 3; 40 nm	2640×10^{6} 389 mm^{2}	1408:88:32	800	70.4	25.6	2253	563	1024; 2048	GDDR5; 256-bit	1250; 1250	160	20	200	PCIe 2.1 ×16
Radeon HD 6970 (Cayman XT)	December 15, 2010 $369 USD	TeraScale 3; 40 nm	2640×10^{6} 389 mm^{2}	1536:96:32	880	84.5	28.2	2703	675	2048	GDDR5; 256-bit	1375	176	20	250	PCIe 2.1 ×16
Radeon HD 6990 (Antilles XT)	March 8, 2011 $699 USD	TeraScale 3; 40 nm	2× / 2640×10^{6} 389 mm^{2}	2× 1536:96:32	830	2× 79.6	2× 26.5	5099	1276.88	2× 2048	GDDR5; 256-bit	1250	2× 160	37	375	PCIe 2.1 ×16

==== IGP (HD 6000) ====
- All models feature the UNB/MC Bus interface
- All models lack double-precision FP
- With driver Update OpenGL 4.4 available (Last Catalyst 15.12). OpenGL 4.5 available with Crimson Beta (driver version 15.30 or higher).
- All models feature Angle independent anisotropic filtering, UVD3, and AMD Eyefinity capabilities, with up to three outputs.
- All models feature 3D Blu-ray Disc acceleration.
- Embedded GPUs as part of AMD's Lynx platform APUs.

Model	Launch	Codename	Architecture	Fab (nm)	Core Clock rate (MHz)	Config core (Note: Unified Shaders : Texture Mapping Units : Render Output Units)	Fillrate		Shared Memory			Processing power (GFLOPS)	API compliance (version)				Combined TDP (Note: TDP specified for AMD reference designs, includes CPU power consumption. Actual TDP of retail products may vary.)		APU Series
Model	Launch	Codename	Architecture	Fab (nm)	Core Clock rate (MHz)	Config core	Pixel (GP/s)	Texture (GT/s)	Bus width (bit)	Bus type	Bandwidth (GB/s)	Processing power (GFLOPS)	Direct3D	OpenGL	OpenCL	Vulkan	Idle (W)	Max. (W)	APU Series
Radeon HD 6370D	November 1, 2011	WinterPark	TeraScale 2	32	443	160:8:4	1.77	3.54	128	DDR3-1600	25.6	142	11.3 (11_0)	4.5	1.2	—N/a	Unknown	65	E2
Radeon HD 6410D	June 20, 2011	WinterPark	TeraScale 2	32	443 (Note: A4-3300 series runs the Radeon HD 6410D at a speed of 443 MHz. Remaining A4 series run at 600 MHz.)–600	160:8:4	1.77–2.4	3.54–4.8	128	DDR3-1600	25.6	142–192	11.3 (11_0)	4.5	1.2	—N/a	Unknown	65	A4
Radeon HD 6530D	June 20, 2011	BeaverCreek	TeraScale 2	32	443	320:16:8	3.54	7.08	128	DDR3-1866	29.9	284	11.3 (11_0)	4.5	1.2	—N/a	Unknown	65–100	A6
Radeon HD 6550D	June 20, 2011	BeaverCreek	TeraScale 2	32	600	400:20:8	4.8	12	128	DDR3-1866	29.9	480	11.3 (11_0)	4.5	1.2	—N/a	Unknown	65–100	A8

=== Radeon HD 7000 series ===
Model (Codename)	Launch	Architecture Fab	Transistors Die Size	Core		Fillrate (Note: Boost values (if available) are stated below the base value in italic.) (Note: Texture fillrate is calculated as the number of Texture Mapping Units multiplied by the base (or boost) core clock speed.) (Note: Pixel fillrate is calculated as the number of Render Output Units multiplied by the base (or boost) core clock speed.)		Processing power (Note: Precision performance is calculated from the base (or boost) core clock speed based on a FMA operation.) (GFLOPS)		Memory (Note: The effective data transfer rate of GDDR5 is quadruple its nominal clock, instead of double as it is with DDR memory.)				TDP (Watts)		Bus interface	Release Price (USD)
Model (Codename)	Launch	Architecture Fab	Transistors Die Size	Config (Note: Unified Shaders : Texture Mapping Units : Render Output Units)	Clock (MHz)	Texture (GT/s)	Pixel (GP/s)	Single	Double	Size (MiB)	Bus type & width	Clock (MHz)	Bandwidth (GB/s)	Idle	Max.	Bus interface	Release Price (USD)
Radeon HD 7350 (Cedar)	January 2012	TeraScale 2 (Note: Lacks hardware video encoder); 40 nm	292×10^{6} 59 mm^{2}	80:8:4	400; 650	3.2; 5.2	1.6; 2.6	104	—N/a	256; 512	DDR2; DDR3; 64-bit	400; 800; 900	6.4; 12.8; 14.4	6.4	19.1	PCIe 2.1 ×16	OEM
Radeon HD 7450 (Caicos)	January 2012	TeraScale 2; 40 nm	370×10^{6} 67 mm^{2}	160:8:4	625; 750	5.0; 6.0	2.5; 3.0	200; 240	—N/a	512; 1024	DDR3; 64-bit	533; 800	8.5; 12.8	9	18	PCIe 2.1 ×16	OEM
Radeon HD 7470 (Caicos)	January 2012	TeraScale 2; 40 nm	370×10^{6} 67 mm^{2}	160:8:4	625; 775	5.0; 6.2	2.5; 3.1	200; 248	—N/a	512; 1024	DDR3; GDDR5; 64-bit	800; 900	12.8; 28.8	9	27	PCIe 2.1 ×16	OEM
Radeon HD 7510 (Turks LE)	February 2013	TeraScale 2; 40 nm	716×10^{6} 118 mm^{2}	320:16:4	650	10.4	2.6	416	—N/a	1024	DDR3; 128-bit	667	21.3	Unknown	Unknown	PCIe 2.1 ×16	OEM
Radeon HD 7570 (Turks Pro-L)	January 2012	TeraScale 2; 40 nm	716×10^{6} 118 mm^{2}	480:24:8	650	15.6	5.2	624	—N/a	512; 1024	DDR3; GDDR5; 128-bit	900; 1000	28.8; 64	10; 11	44; 60	PCIe 2.1 ×16	OEM
Radeon HD 7670 (Turks XT)	January 2012	TeraScale 2; 40 nm	716×10^{6} 118 mm^{2}	480:24:8	800	19.2	6.4	768	—N/a	512; 1024	GDDR5; 128-bit	1000	64	12	66	PCIe 2.1 ×16	OEM
Radeon HD 7730 (Cape Verde LE)	April 2013	GCN 1^{st} gen 28 nm	1500×10^{6} 123 mm^{2}	384:24:8	800	19.2	6.4	614.4	38.4	1024	DDR3; GDDR5; 128-bit	1125	25.6; 72	10	47	PCIe 3.0 ×16	$60
Radeon HD 7750 (Cape Verde Pro)	February 2012	GCN 1^{st} gen 28 nm	1500×10^{6} 123 mm^{2}	512:32:16	800; 900	25.6; 28.8	12.8; 14.4	819.2; 921.6	51.2; 57.6	1024; 2048; 4096	DDR3; GDDR5; 128-bit	800; 1125	25.6; 72	10	55	PCIe 3.0 ×16	$110
Radeon HD 7770 GHz Edition (Cape Verde XT)	February 2012	GCN 1^{st} gen 28 nm	1500×10^{6} 123 mm^{2}	640:40:16	1000	40	16	1280	80	1024; 2048	GDDR5; 128-bit	1125	72	10	80	PCIe 3.0 ×16	$160
Radeon HD 7790 (Bonaire XT)	March 2013	GCN 2^{nd} gen 28 nm	2080×10^{6} 160 mm^{2}	896:56:16	1000	56.0	16.0	1792	128	1024; 2048	GDDR5; 128-bit	1500	96	10	85	PCIe 3.0 ×16	$150
Radeon HD 7850 (Pitcairn Pro)	March 2012	GCN 1^{st} gen 28 nm	2800×10^{6} 212 mm^{2}	1024:64:32	860	55.04	27.52	1761.28	110.08	1024; 2048	GDDR5; 256-bit	1200	153.6	10	130	PCIe 3.0 ×16	$250
Radeon HD 7870 GHz Edition (Pitcairn XT)	March 2012	GCN 1^{st} gen 28 nm	2800×10^{6} 212 mm^{2}	1280:80:32	1000	80	32	2560	160	2048	GDDR5; 256-bit	1200	153.6	10	175	PCIe 3.0 ×16	$350
Radeon HD 7870 XT (Tahiti LE)	November 2012	GCN 1^{st} gen 28 nm	4313×10^{6} 352 mm^{2}	1536:96:32	925; 975	88.8	29.6	2841.6; 2995.2	710.4; 748.8	2048	GDDR5; 256-bit	1500	192.0	15	185	PCIe 3.0 ×16	$270
Radeon HD 7950 (Tahiti Pro)	January 2012	GCN 1^{st} gen 28 nm	4313×10^{6} 352 mm^{2}	1792:112:32	800	89.6	25.6	2867.2	717	3072	GDDR5; 384-bit	1250	240	15	200	PCIe 3.0 ×16	$450
Radeon HD 7950 Boost (Tahiti Pro2)	August 2012	GCN 1^{st} gen 28 nm	4313×10^{6} 352 mm^{2}	1792:112:32	850; 925	103.6	29.6	3046.4; 3315.2	761.6; 828.8	3072	GDDR5; 384-bit	1250	240	15	225	PCIe 3.0 ×16	$330
Radeon HD 7970 (Tahiti XT)	December 2011	GCN 1^{st} gen 28 nm	4313×10^{6} 352 mm^{2}	2048:128:32	925	118.4	29.6	3788.8	947.2	3072; 6144	GDDR5; 384-bit	1375	264	15	250	PCIe 3.0 ×16	$550
Radeon HD 7970 GHz Edition (Tahiti XT2)	June 2012	GCN 1^{st} gen 28 nm	4313×10^{6} 352 mm^{2}	2048:128:32	1000; 1050	128.0	32	4096; 4300.8	1024; 1075	3072; 6144	GDDR5; 384-bit	1500	288	15	250	PCIe 3.0 ×16	$500
Radeon HD 7990 (New Zealand)	April 2013	GCN 1^{st} gen 28 nm	2× 4313×10^{6} 352 mm^{2}	2× 2048:128:32	950; 1000	2× 128	2× 32	7782.4; 8192	1945.6; 2048	2× 3072	GDDR5; 384-bit	1500	2× 288	15	375	PCIe 3.0 ×16	$1000
Model (Codename)	Launch	Architecture Fab	Transistors Die Size	Config	Clock (MHz)	Texture (GT/s)	Pixel (GP/s)	Single	Double	Size (MiB)	Bus type & width	Clock (MHz)	Bandwidth (GB/s)	Idle	Max.	Bus interface	Release Price (USD)
Model (Codename)	Launch	Architecture Fab	Transistors Die Size	Core		Fillrate		Processing power (GFLOPS)		Memory				TDP (Watts)		Bus interface	Release Price (USD)

==== IGP (HD 7000) ====
- All models feature the UNB/MC Bus interface
- All models do not support double-precision FP
- TeraScale 2 (VLIW5) based APUs feature angle independent anisotropic filtering, UVD3, and Eyefinity capabilities, with up to three outputs.
- TeraScale 3 (VLIW4) based APUs feature angle independent anisotropic filtering, UVD3.2, and Eyefinity capabilities, with up to four outputs.

Model	Launch	Code name	Architecture	Fab (nm)	Core Clock (MHz)		Config core (Note: Unified Shaders : Texture Mapping Units : Render Output Units)	Fillrate		Shared Memory			Processing power (GFLOPS)	API compliance (version)			TDP (W) (Note: TDP specified for AMD reference designs, includes CPU power consumption. Actual TDP of retail products may vary.)	APU
Model	Launch	Code name	Architecture	Fab (nm)	Base	Turbo	Config core	Texture (GT/s)	Pixel (GP/s)	Bus width (bit)	Bus type	Bandwidth (GB/s)	Processing power (GFLOPS)	Direct3D	OpenGL (Note: OpenGL 4.5 possible for Terascale 3 with AMD Radeon Software Crimson Beta (driver 15.30 or higher).)	OpenCL	TDP (W)	APU
Radeon HD 7310	June 6, 2012	Ontario	TeraScale 2 (Note: Lacks hardware video encoder)	40	500	—N/a	80:8:4	4.00	2.00	64	DDR3-1066	8.53	80	11.3 (11_0)	4.5	1.2	18	E2-1200
Radeon HD 7340	June 6, 2012	Ontario	TeraScale 2	40	523	680	80:8:4	5.44	2.72	64	DDR3-1333	10.66	83.6–108.8	11.3 (11_0)	4.5	1.2	18	E2-1800
Radeon HD 7480D	June 1, 2012	Scrapper	TeraScale 3	32	723	—N/a	128:8:4	11.6	2.9	128	DDR3-1600	25.6	185	11.3 (11_0)	4.5	1.2	65	A4-4000, A4-5300
Radeon HD 7540D	June 1, 2012	Scrapper	TeraScale 3	32	760	—N/a	192:12:4	Unknown		128	DDR3-1866	29.9	292	11.3 (11_0)	4.5	1.2	65	A6-5400K
Radeon HD 7560D	June 1, 2012	Devastator	TeraScale 3	32	760	—N/a	256:16:4	Unknown		128	DDR3-1866	29.9	389	11.3 (11_0)	4.5	1.2	65–100	A8-5500, A8-5600K
Radeon HD 7660D	June 1, 2012	Devastator	TeraScale 3	32	760	800	384:24:8	16.2	2.7	128	DDR3-1866	29.9	584–614	11.3 (11_0)	4.5	1.2	65–100	A10-5700 (760 MHz), A10-5800K (800 MHz)

=== Radeon HD 8000 series ===
Model (Codename)	Launch	Architecture (Fab)	Transistors Die Size	Core		Fillrate (Note: Boost values (if available) are stated below the base value in italic.) (Note: Texture fillrate is calculated as the number of Texture Mapping Units multiplied by the base (or boost) core clock speed.) (Note: Pixel fillrate is calculated as the number of Render Output Units multiplied by the base (or boost) core clock speed.)		Processing power (Note: Precision performance is calculated from the base (or boost) core clock speed based on a FMA operation.) (GFLOPS)		Memory (Note: The effective data transfer rate of GDDR5 is quadruple its nominal clock, instead of double as with DDR memory.)				TDP (W)	Bus interface
Model (Codename)	Launch	Architecture (Fab)	Transistors Die Size	Config (Note: Unified Shaders : Texture Mapping Units : Render Output Units)	Clock (MHz)	Texture (GT/s)	Pixel (GP/s)	Single	Double	Size (MiB)	Bus type & width (bit)	Clock (MHz)	Band- width (GB/s)	Idle Max	Bus interface
Radeon HD 8350 (Cedar)	January 8, 2013	TeraScale 2 (Note: Lacks hardware video encoder) (40 nm)	292×10^{6} 59 mm^{2}	80:8:4	400–650	3.2; 5.2	1.6; 2.6	104	—N/a	256; 512	DDR2; DDR3; 64-bit	400; 800	6.4; 12.8	6.4; 19.1	PCIe 2.1 ×16
Radeon HD 8450 (Caicos)	January 8, 2013	TeraScale 2 (40 nm)	370×10^{6} 67 mm^{2}	160:8:4	625	5.0	2.5	200	—N/a	512	DDR3; 64-bit	533	8.53	9; 18	PCIe 2.1 ×16
Radeon HD 8470 (Caicos)	January 8, 2013	TeraScale 2 (40 nm)	370×10^{6} 67 mm^{2}	160:8:4	750	6.0	3.0	240	—N/a	1024	GDDR5; 64-bit	800	25.6	9; 35	PCIe 2.1 ×16
Radeon HD 8490 (Caicos)	July 23, 2013	TeraScale 2 (40 nm)	370×10^{6} 67 mm^{2}	160:8:4	875	7.0	3.5	280	—N/a	1024	DDR3L; GDDR5; 64-bit	800; 900	12.8; 28.8	9; 35	PCIe 2.1 ×16
Radeon HD 8570 (Oland)	January 8, 2013	GCN 1^{st} gen (28 nm)	950×10^{6} 77 mm^{2}	384:24:8	730	19.2	6.4	560	35	2048	DDR3; GDDR5; 128-bit	900; 1150	28.8; 72	12; 66	PCIe 3.0 ×8
Radeon HD 8670 (Oland)	January 8, 2013	GCN 1^{st} gen (28 nm)	950×10^{6} 77 mm^{2}	384:24:8	1000	24	8	768	48	2048	GDDR5; 128-bit	1150	72	16; 86	PCIe 3.0 ×8
Radeon HD 8730 (Cape Verde LE)	September 5, 2013	GCN 1^{st} gen (28 nm)	1500×10^{6} 123 mm^{2}	384:24:8	800	19.2	6.4	614.4	44.8	1024	GDDR5; 128-bit	1125	72	10; 47	PCIe 3.0 ×16
Radeon HD 8760 (Cape Verde XT)	January 8, 2013	GCN 1^{st} gen (28 nm)	1500×10^{6} 123 mm^{2}	640:40:16	1000	40	16	1280	80	2048	GDDR5; 128-bit	1125	72	16; 80	PCIe 3.0 ×16
Radeon HD 8770 (Bonaire XT)	September 2, 2013	GCN 2^{nd} gen (28 nm)	2080×10^{6} 160 mm^{2}	896:56:16	1000	56.0	16.0	1792	128	2048	GDDR5; 128-bit	1500	96	10; 85	PCIe 3.0 ×16
Radeon HD 8870 (Pitcairn XT)	January 8, 2013	GCN 1^{st} gen (28 nm)	2800×10^{6} 212 mm^{2}	1280:80:32	1000	80	32	2560	160	2048	GDDR5; 256-bit	1200	153.6	15; 150	PCIe 3.0 ×16
Radeon HD 8950 (Tahiti Pro)	January 8, 2013	GCN 1^{st} gen (28 nm)	4313×10^{6} 352 mm^{2}	1792:112:32	850; 925	95.2; 103.6	27.2; 29.6	3046.4; 3315.2	761.6; 828.8	3072	GDDR5; 384-bit	1250	240	15; 225	PCIe 3.0 ×16
Radeon HD 8970 (Tahiti XT2)	January 8, 2013	GCN 1^{st} gen (28 nm)	4313×10^{6} 352 mm^{2}	2048:128:32	1000; 1050	128.0; 134.4	32; 33.6	4096; 4301	1024; 1075	3072	GDDR5; 384-bit	1500	288	15; 250	PCIe 3.0 ×16
Radeon HD 8990 (Malta)	April 24, 2013	GCN 1^{st} gen (28 nm)	2× 4313×10^{6} 2× 352 mm^{2}	2× 2048:128:32	950; 1000	2× 128	2× 32	7782; 8192	1946; 2048	2× 3072	GDDR5; 384-bit	1500	2× 288	15; 375	PCIe 3.0 ×16
Model (Codename)	Launch	Architecture (Fab)	Transistors Die Size	Config	Clock (MHz)	Texture (GT/s)	Pixel (GP/s)	Single	Double	Size (MiB)	Bus type & width (bit)	Clock (MHz)	Band- width (GB/s)	Idle Max	Bus interface
Model (Codename)	Launch	Architecture (Fab)	Transistors Die Size	Core		Fillrate		Processing power (GFLOPS)		Memory				TDP (W)	Bus interface

=== Radeon 200 series ===
Model (codename)	Release Date & Price	Architecture & Fab	Transistors & Die Size	Core		Fillrate (Note: Boost values (if available) are stated below the base value in italic.) (Note: Texture fillrate is calculated as the number of Texture Mapping Units multiplied by the base (or boost) core clock speed.) (Note: Pixel fillrate is calculated as the number of Render Output Units multiplied by the base (or boost) core clock speed.)		Processing power (Note: Precision performance is calculated from the base (or boost) core clock speed based on a FMA operation.) (GFLOPS)		Memory				TBP	Bus interface
Model (codename)	Release Date & Price	Architecture & Fab	Transistors & Die Size	Config (Note: Unified Shaders : Texture Mapping Units : Render Output Units)	Clock (MHz)	Texture (GT/s)	Pixel (GP/s)	Single	Double	Size (MiB)	Bus type & width	Clock (MT/s)	Band- width (GB/s)	TBP	Bus interface
Radeon R5 220 (Caicos Pro)	December 21, 2013; OEM	Terascale 2 (Note: Lacks hardware video encoder); 40 nm	370×10^{6} 67 mm^{2}	80:8:4	625; 650	5	2.5	200	—N/a	1024	DDR3; 64-bit	1066	8.53	18 W	PCIe 2.1 ×16
Radeon R5 230 (Caicos Pro)	April 3, 2014 ?	Terascale 2; 40 nm	370×10^{6} 67 mm^{2}	160:8:4	625	5	2.5	200	—N/a	1024; 2048	DDR3; 64-bit	1066	8.53	19 W	PCIe 2.1 ×16
Radeon R5 235 (Caicos XT)	December 21, 2013; OEM	Terascale 2; 40 nm	370×10^{6} 67 mm^{2}	160:8:4	775	6.2	3.1	248	—N/a	1024	DDR3; 64-bit	1800	14.4	35 W	PCIe 2.1 ×16
Radeon R5 235X (Caicos XT)	December 21, 2013; OEM	Terascale 2; 40 nm	370×10^{6} 67 mm^{2}	160:8:4	875	7.0	3.5	280	—N/a	1024	DDR3; 64-bit	1800	14.4	18 W	PCIe 2.1 ×16
Radeon R5 240 (Oland)	November 1, 2013; OEM	GCN 1^{st} gen 28 nm	1040×10^{6} 90 mm^{2}	384:24:8	730; 780	14.6	5.84	560.6; 599	29.2	1024; 2048	DDR3; GDDR3; 64-bit	1800; 2000	14.4; 16.0	30 W	PCIe 3.0 ×8
Radeon R7 240 (Oland Pro)	August 8, 2013; US $69	GCN 1^{st} gen 28 nm	1040×10^{6} 90 mm^{2}	320:20:8	730; 780	14.6	5.84	467.2; 499.2	29.2	2048; 4096	DDR3; GDDR5; 128-bit	1800; 4500	28.8; 72	30 W, <45 W (4 GB)	PCIe 3.0 ×8
Radeon R7 250 (Oland XT)	August 8, 2013; US $89	GCN 1^{st} gen 28 nm	1040×10^{6} 90 mm^{2}	384:24:8	1000 (1050)	24	8	768; 806.4	48	1024; 2048	DDR3; GDDR5; 128-bit	1800; 4600	28.8; 73.6	75 W	PCIe 3.0 ×8
Radeon R7 250E (Cape Verde Pro)	December 21, 2013; US $109	GCN 1^{st} gen 28 nm	1500×10^{6} 123 mm^{2}	512:32:16	800	25.6	12.8	819.2	51.2	1024; 2048	GDDR5; 128-bit	4500	72	55 W	PCIe 3.0 ×16
Radeon R7 250X (Cape Verde XT)	February 10, 2014; US $99	GCN 1^{st} gen 28 nm	1500×10^{6} 123 mm^{2}	640:40:16	1000	40	16	1280	80	1024; 2048	GDDR5; 128-bit	4500	72	95 W	PCIe 3.0 ×16
Radeon R7 260 (Bonaire)	December 17, 2013; US $109	GCN 2^{nd} gen 28 nm	2080×10^{6} 160 mm^{2}	768:48:16	1000	48	16	1536	96	1024	GDDR5; 128-bit	6000	96	95 W	PCIe 3.0 ×16
Radeon R7 260X (Bonaire XTX)	August 8, 2013; US $139	GCN 2^{nd} gen 28 nm	2080×10^{6} 160 mm^{2}	896:56:16	1100	61.6	17.6	1971.2	123.2	1024; 2048	GDDR5; 128-bit	6500	104	115 W	PCIe 3.0 ×16
Radeon R7 265 (Pitcairn Pro)	February 13, 2014; US $149	GCN 1^{st} gen 28 nm	2800×10^{6} 212 mm^{2}	1024:64:32	900; 925	57.6	28.8	1843.2	115.2	2048	GDDR5; 256-bit	5600	179.2	150 W	PCIe 3.0 ×16
Radeon R9 270 (Pitcairn XT)	November 13, 2013; US $179	GCN 1^{st} gen 28 nm	2800×10^{6} 212 mm^{2}	1280:80:32	900; 925	72	28.8	2304; 2368	144; 148	2048	GDDR5; 256-bit	5600	179.2	150 W	PCIe 3.0 ×16
Radeon R9 270X (Pitcairn XT)	August 8, 2013; US $199	GCN 1^{st} gen 28 nm	2800×10^{6} 212 mm^{2}	1280:80:32	1000; 1050	80	32	2560; 2688	160; 168	2048; 4096	GDDR5; 256-bit	5600	179.2	180 W	PCIe 3.0 ×16
Radeon R9 280 (Tahiti Pro)	March 4, 2014; US $249	GCN 1^{st} gen 28 nm	4313×10^{6} 352 mm^{2}	1792:112:32	827; 933	92.6	26.5	2964; 3343.9	741; 836	3072	GDDR5; 384-bit	5000	240	250 W	PCIe 3.0 ×16
Radeon R9 280X (Tahiti XTL)	August 8, 2013; US $299	GCN 1^{st} gen 28 nm	4313×10^{6} 352 mm^{2}	2048:128:32	850; 1000	109–128	27.2–32	3481.6; 4096	870.4; 1024	3072	GDDR5; 384-bit	6000	288	250 W	PCIe 3.0 ×16
Radeon R9 285 (Tonga Pro)	September 2, 2014; US $249	GCN 3^{rd} gen 28 nm	5000×10^{6} 359 mm^{2}	1792:112:32	918	102.8	29.4	3290	206.6	2048	GDDR5; 256-bit	5500	176 (Note: The R9 285 utilizes loss-less colour compression which can increase effective memory performance (relative to GCN 1^{st} gen and 2^{nd} gen cards) in certain situations.)	190 W	PCIe 3.0 ×16
Radeon R9 285X (Tonga XT)	Unreleased	GCN 3^{rd} gen 28 nm	5000×10^{6} 359 mm^{2}	2048:128:32	1002	128.3	32.1	4104	256.5	3072	GDDR5; 384-bit	5500	264	200 W	PCIe 3.0 ×16
Radeon R9 290 (Hawaii Pro)	November 5, 2013; US $399	GCN 2^{nd} gen 28 nm	6200×10^{6} 438 mm^{2}	2560:160:64	up to 947 (Note: Base clock of R9 290 and R9 290X will maintain at 947 MHz and 1000 MHz before reaching 95 °C, respectively.)	151.52	60.608	4848.6	606.1	4096	GDDR5; 512-bit	5000	320	250 W	PCIe 3.0 ×16
Radeon R9 290X (Hawaii XT)	October 24, 2013; November 6, 2014; US $549	GCN 2^{nd} gen 28 nm	6200×10^{6} 438 mm^{2}	2816:176:64	1000	176	64	5632	704	4096; 8192	GDDR5; 512-bit	5000	320	250 W	PCIe 3.0 ×16
Radeon R9 295X2 (Vesuvius)	April 8, 2014; US $1499	GCN 2^{nd} gen 28 nm	2× 6200×10^{6} 2× 438 mm^{2}	2× 2816:176:64	1018	358.33	130.3	11466.75	1433.34	2× 4096	GDDR5; 512-bit	5000	2× 320	500 W	PCIe 3.0 ×16
Model (codename)	Release Date & Price	Architecture & Fab	Transistors & Die Size	Config	Clock (MHz)	Texture (GT/s)	Pixel (GP/s)	Single	Double	Size (MiB)	Bus type & width	Clock (MT/s)	Band- width (GB/s)	TBP	Bus interface
Model (codename)	Release Date & Price	Architecture & Fab	Transistors & Die Size	Core		Fillrate		Processing power (GFLOPS)		Memory				TBP	Bus interface

=== Radeon 300 series ===
Model (Codename)	Release Date & Price	Architecture (Fab)	Transistors Die Size	Core		Fillrate (Note: Boost values (if available) are stated below the base value in italic.) (Note: Texture fillrate is calculated as the number of Texture Mapping Units multiplied by the base (or boost) core clock speed.) (Note: Pixel fillrate is calculated as the number of Render Output Units multiplied by the base (or boost) core clock speed.)		Processing power (Note: Precision performance is calculated from the base (or boost) core clock speed based on a FMA operation. Double precision performance of Hawaii cards is 1/8 of single precision performance, for the other it is 1/16 of single precision performance.) (GFLOPS)		Memory				TBP (W)	Bus interface
Model (Codename)	Release Date & Price	Architecture (Fab)	Transistors Die Size	Config (Note: Unified Shaders : Texture Mapping Units : Render Output Units)	Clock (MHz)	Texture (GT/s)	Pixel (GP/s)	Single	Double	Size (MiB)	Bus type & width	Clock (MT/s)	Band- width (GB/s)	TBP (W)	Bus interface
Radeon R5 330 (Oland Pro)	May 2015; OEM	GCN 1^{st} gen (28 nm)	1040×10^{6} 90 mm^{2}	320:20:8	Unknown; 855	17.1	6.84	547.2	34.2	1024; 2048	DDR3; 128-bit	1800	28.8	30	PCIe 3.0 x4 x8 ×16
Radeon R5 340 (Oland XT)	May 2015; OEM	GCN 1^{st} gen (28 nm)	1040×10^{6} 90 mm^{2}	384:24:8	Unknown; 825	19.8	6.6	633.6	39.6	1024; 2048	DDR3; GDDR5; 128-bit	1800; 4500	28.8; 72	75	PCIe 3.0 x4 x8 ×16
Radeon R7 340 (Oland XT)	May 2015; OEM	GCN 1^{st} gen (28 nm)	1040×10^{6} 90 mm^{2}	384:24:8	730; 780	17.5; 18.7	5.8; 6.2	560.6; 599	32.7; 35	1024; 2048; 4096	DDR3; GDDR5; 128-bit	1800; 4500	28.8; 72	75	PCIe 3.0 x4 x8 ×16
Radeon R5 340X (Oland XT)	May 2015; OEM	GCN 1^{st} gen (28 nm)	1040×10^{6} 90 mm^{2}	384:24:8	1050	25.2	8.4	806	50.4	2048	DDR3; 64-bit	2000	16	65	PCIe 3.0 x4 x8 ×16
Radeon R7 350 (Oland XT)	May 2015; OEM	GCN 1^{st} gen (28 nm)	1040×10^{6} 90 mm^{2}	384:24:8	1000; 1050	24; 25.2	8; 8.4	768; 806.4	48; 50.4	1024; 2048	DDR3; GDDR5; 128-bit	1800; 4500	28.8; 72	75	PCIe 3.0 x4 x8 ×16
Radeon R7 350 (Cape Verde XTL)	February 2016 $89 USD	GCN 1^{st} gen (28 nm)	1500×10^{6} 123 mm^{2}	512:32:16	925	29.6	14.8	947.2	59.2	2048	GDDR5; 128-bit	4500	72	75	PCIe 3.0 x4 x8 ×16
Radeon R7 350X (Oland XT)	May 2015; OEM	GCN 1^{st} gen (28 nm)	1040×10^{6} 90 mm^{2}	384:24:8	1050	25.2	8.4	806	50.4	4096	DDR3; 128-bit	2000	32	30	PCIe 3.0 x4 x8 ×16
Radeon R7 360 (Bonaire Pro)	June 2015 $109 USD	GCN 2^{nd} gen (28 nm)	2080×10^{6} 160 mm^{2}	768:48:16	1050	50.4	16.8	1612.8	100.8	2048	GDDR5; 128-bit	6500	104	100	PCIe 3.0 x4 x8 ×16
Radeon R9 360 (Bonaire Pro)	May 2015; OEM	GCN 2^{nd} gen (28 nm)	2080×10^{6} 160 mm^{2}	768:48:16	1000; 1050	48; 50.4	16; 16.8	1536; 1612.8	96; 100.8	2048	GDDR5; 128-bit	6500	104	85	PCIe 3.0 x4 x8 ×16
Radeon R7 370 (Pitcairn Pro)	June 2015 $149 USD	GCN 1^{st} gen (28 nm)	2800×10^{6} 212 mm^{2}	1024:64:32	975	62.4	31.2	1996.8	124.8	2048; 4096	GDDR5; 256-bit	5600	179.2	110	PCIe 3.0 x4 x8 ×16
Radeon R9 370 (Pitcairn Pro)	May 2015; OEM	GCN 1^{st} gen (28 nm)	2800×10^{6} 212 mm^{2}	1024:64:32	950; 975	60.8; 62.4	30.4; 31.2	1945.6; 1996.8	121.6; 124.8	2048; 4096	GDDR5; 256-bit	5600	179.2	150	PCIe 3.0 x4 x8 ×16
Radeon R9 370X (Pitcairn XT)	August 2015 $179 USD	GCN 1^{st} gen (28 nm)	2800×10^{6} 212 mm^{2}	1280:80:32	1000	80	32	2560	160	2048; 4096	GDDR5; 256-bit	5600	179.2	185	PCIe 3.0 x4 x8 ×16
Radeon R9 380 (Tonga Pro)	May 2015; OEM	GCN 3^{rd} gen (28 nm)	5000×10^{6} 359 mm^{2}	1792:112:32	918	102.8	29.4	3290	206.6	4096	GDDR5; 256-bit	5500	176	190	PCIe 3.0 x4 x8 ×16
Radeon R9 380 (Tonga Pro)	June 2015 $199 USD	GCN 3^{rd} gen (28 nm)	5000×10^{6} 359 mm^{2}	1792:112:32	970	108.6	31.0	3476.5	217.3	2048; 4096	GDDR5; 256-bit	5700	182.4 (Note: The R9 380 utilizes loss-less color compression which can increase effective memory performance (relative to GCN 1^{st} gen and 2^{nd} gen cards) in certain situations.)	190	PCIe 3.0 x4 x8 ×16
Radeon R9 380X (Tonga XT)	November 2015 $229 USD	GCN 3^{rd} gen (28 nm)	5000×10^{6} 359 mm^{2}	2048:128:32	970	124.2	31.0	3973.1	248.3	4096	GDDR5; 256-bit	5700	182.4	190	PCIe 3.0 x4 x8 ×16
Radeon R9 390 (Grenada Pro)	June 2015 $329 USD	GCN 2^{nd} gen (28 nm)	6200×10^{6} 438 mm^{2}	2560:160:64	1000	160	64	5120	640	8192	GDDR5; 512-bit	6000	384	275	PCIe 3.0 x4 x8 ×16
Radeon R9 390X (Grenada XT)	June 2015 $429 USD	GCN 2^{nd} gen (28 nm)	6200×10^{6} 438 mm^{2}	2816:176:64	1050	184.8	67.2	5913.6	739.2	8192	GDDR5; 512-bit	6000	384	275	PCIe 3.0 x4 x8 ×16
Radeon R9 Fury (Fiji Pro)	July 2015 $549 USD	GCN 3^{rd} gen (28 nm)	8900×10^{6} 596 mm^{2}	3584:224:64	1000	224	64	7168	448	4096	HBM; 4096-bit	1000	512	275	PCIe 3.0 x4 x8 ×16
Radeon R9 Nano (Fiji XT)	August 2015 $649 USD	GCN 3^{rd} gen (28 nm)	8900×10^{6} 596 mm^{2}	4096:256:64	1000	256	64	8192	512	4096	HBM; 4096-bit	1000	512	175	PCIe 3.0 x4 x8 ×16
Radeon R9 Fury X (Fiji XT)	June 2015 $649 USD	GCN 3^{rd} gen (28 nm)	8900×10^{6} 596 mm^{2}	4096:256:64	1050	268.8	67.2	8601.6	537.6	4096	HBM; 4096-bit	1000	512	275	PCIe 3.0 x4 x8 ×16
Radeon Pro Duo (Fiji XT)	April 2016 $1499 USD	GCN 3^{rd} gen (28 nm)	2× 8900×10^{6} 2× 596 mm^{2}	2× 4096:256:64	1000	512	128	16384	1024	2× 4096	HBM; 4096-bit	1000	2× 512	350	PCIe 3.0 x4 x8 ×16
Model (Codename)	Release Date & Price	Architecture (Fab)	Transistors Die Size	Config	Clock (MHz)	Texture (GT/s)	Pixel (GP/s)	Single	Double	Size (MiB)	Bus type & width	Clock (MT/s)	Band- width (GB/s)	TBP (W)	Bus interface
Model (Codename)	Release Date & Price	Architecture (Fab)	Transistors Die Size	Core		Fillrate		Processing power (GFLOPS)		Memory				TBP (W)	Bus interface

=== Radeon 400 series ===
Model (Codename)	Release Date & Price	Architecture & Fab	Transistors & Die Size	Core		Fillrate (Note: Boost values (if available) are stated below the base value in italic.) (Note: Texture fillrate is calculated as the number of Texture Mapping Units multiplied by the base (or boost) core clock speed.) (Note: Pixel fillrate is calculated as the number of Render Output Units multiplied by the base (or boost) core clock speed.)		Processing power (Note: Precision performance is calculated from the base (or boost) core clock speed based on a FMA operation.) (GFLOPS)		Memory				TBP	Bus interface
Model (Codename)	Release Date & Price	Architecture & Fab	Transistors & Die Size	Config (Note: Unified Shaders : Texture Mapping Units : Render Output Units and Compute Units (CU))	Clock (MHz)	Texture (GT/s)	Pixel (GP/s)	Single	Double	Size (GiB)	Bus type & width	Clock (MT/s)	Band- width (GB/s)	TBP	Bus interface
Radeon R5 430 (Oland Pro)	June 30, 2016; OEM	GCN 1^{st} gen 28 nm	1040×10^{6} 90 mm^{2}	384:24:8; 6 CU	730; 780	17.52; 18.72	5.84; 6.24	560; 599	37.4; 40	1; 2	DDR3; GDDR5; 64-bit	1800; 4500	28.8; 36	50 W	PCIe 3.0 ×8
Radeon R5 435 (Oland)	June 30, 2016; OEM	GCN 1^{st} gen 28 nm	1040×10^{6} 90 mm^{2}	320:20:8; 5 CU	1030	20.6	8.24	659	41.2	2	DDR3; 64-bit	2000	16	50 W	PCIe 3.0 ×8
Radeon R7 430 (Oland Pro)	June 30, 2016; OEM	GCN 1^{st} gen 28 nm	1040×10^{6} 90 mm^{2}	384:24:8; 6 CU	730; 780	17.52; 18.72	5.84; 6.24	560; 599	37.4; 40	1; 2; 4	DDR3; GDDR5; 128-bit	1800; 4500	28.8; 72	50 W	PCIe 3.0 ×8
Radeon R7 435 (Oland)	June 30, 2016; OEM	GCN 1^{st} gen 28 nm	1040×10^{6} 90 mm^{2}	320:20:8; 5 CU	920	18.4	7.36	589	36.8	2	DDR3; 64-bit	2000	16	50 W	PCIe 3.0 ×8
Radeon R7 450 (Cape Verde Pro)	June 30, 2016; OEM	GCN 1^{st} gen 28 nm	1500×10^{6} 123 mm^{2}	512:32:16; 8 CU	1050	33.6	16.8	1075	65.2	2; 4	GDDR5; 128-bit	4500	72	65 W	PCIe 3.0 ×16
Radeon RX 455 (Bonaire Pro)	June 30, 2016; OEM	GCN 2^{nd} gen 28 nm	2080×10^{6} 160 mm^{2}	768:48:16; 12 CU	1050	50.4	16.8	1613	100.8	2	GDDR5; 128-bit	6500	104	100 W	PCIe 3.0 ×16
Radeon RX 460 (Baffin)	August 8, 2016 $109 USD(2 GB) $139 USD(4 GB)	GCN 4^{th} gen GloFo; 14LPP (Note: GlobalFoundries' 14 nm 14LPP FinFET process is second-sourced from Samsung Electronics.)	3000×10^{6} 123 mm^{2}	896:56:16; 14 CU	1090; 1200	61; 67.2	17.4; 19.2	1953; 2150	122; 132	2; 4	GDDR5; 128-bit	7000	112	<75 W	PCIe 3.0 ×8
Radeon RX 470D (Ellesmere)	October 21, 2016; CNY ¥1299 (China Only)	GCN 4^{th} gen GloFo; 14LPP	5700×10^{6} 232 mm^{2}	1792:112:32; 28 CU	926; 1206	103.7; 135.1	29.6; 38.6	3319; 4322	207; 270	4	GDDR5; 256-bit	7000	224	120 W	PCIe 3.0 ×16
Radeon RX 470 (Ellesmere Pro)	August 4, 2016 $179 USD	GCN 4^{th} gen GloFo; 14LPP	5700×10^{6} 232 mm^{2}	2048:128:32; 32 CU	926; 1206	118.5; 154.4	29.6; 38.6	3793; 4940	237; 309	4; 8	GDDR5; 256-bit	6600	211	120 W	PCIe 3.0 ×16
Radeon RX 480 (Ellesmere XT)	June 29, 2016 $199 USD (4 GB) $239 USD (8 GB)	GCN 4^{th} gen GloFo; 14LPP	5700×10^{6} 232 mm^{2}	2304:144:32; 36 CU	1120; 1266	161.3; 182.3	35.8; 40.5	5161; 5834	323; 365	4; 8	GDDR5; 256-bit	7000; 8000	224; 256	150 W	PCIe 3.0 ×16

=== Radeon 500 series ===
Model (Code name)	Release Date & Price	Architecture & fab	Transistors & die size	Core		Fillrate (Note: Boost values (if available) are stated below the base value in italic.) (Note: Texture fillrate is calculated as the number of Texture Mapping Units multiplied by the base (or boost) core clock speed.) (Note: Pixel fillrate is calculated as the number of Render Output Units multiplied by the base (or boost) core clock speed.)		Processing power (Note: Precision performance is calculated from the base (or boost) core clock speed based on a FMA operation.) (GFLOPS)		Memory				TBP	Bus interface
Model (Code name)	Release Date & Price	Architecture & fab	Transistors & die size	Config (Note: Unified shaders : Texture mapping units : Render output units and Compute units (CU))	Clock (MHz)	Texture (GT/s)	Pixel (GP/s)	Single	Double	Size	Bus type & width	Clock (MT/s)	Bandwidth (GB/s)	TBP	Bus interface
Radeon 520 (Banks) (Note: Lacks hardware video encoder and decoder)	Apr 18, 2017; OEM	GCN 1; 28 nm	690×10^{6} 56mm^{2}	320:20:4; 5 CU	1030	20.6	4.1	659.2	41.2	1 GB; 2 GB	DDR3; GDDR5; 64-bit	2000; 4500	16; 36	?	PCIe 3.0 ×8
Radeon 530 (Weston)	Apr 18, 2017; OEM	GCN 3; 28 nm	? 125 mm^{2}	320:20:8; 5 CU	1024	20.480	8.2	655.36	40.96	1 GB; 2 GB; 4 GB	DDR3; GDDR5; 64-bit	1800; 4500	14.4; 36	?	PCIe 3.0 ×8
Radeon 530 (Weston)	Apr 18, 2017; OEM	GCN 3; 28 nm	? 125 mm^{2}	384:24:8; 6 CU	1024	24.576	8.2	786.432	49.152	1 GB; 2 GB; 4 GB	DDR3; GDDR5; 64-bit	1800; 4500	14.4; 36	?	PCIe 3.0 ×8
Radeon RX 540 (Polaris 12)	Apr 18, 2017; OEM	GCN 4 GloFo; 14LPP (Note: GlobalFoundries' 14 nm 14LPP FinFET process is second-sourced from Samsung Electronics.)	2.2×10^{9} 101 mm^{2}	512:32:16; 8 CU	1124; 1219	35.968; 39.008	17.984; 19.504	1150.976; 1248.256	71.936; 78.016	2 GB; 4 GB	GDDR5; 128-bit	6000	96	?	PCIe 3.0 ×8
Radeon RX 550 (Polaris 12)	Apr 20, 2017 $79 USD	GCN 4 GloFo; 14LPP	2.2×10^{9} 101 mm^{2}	512:32:16; 8 CU	1100; 1183	35.2; 37.856	17.6; 18.928	1126.4; 1211.392	70.4; 75.712	2 GB; 4 GB	GDDR5; 128-bit	7000	112	50 W	PCIe 3.0 ×8
Radeon RX 550 640SP (Polaris 11)	Apr 20, 2017 $79 USD	GCN 4 GloFo; 14LPP	3.0×10^{9} 123 mm^{2}	640:40:16; 10 CU	1019; 1071	40.76; 42.84	16.304; 17.136	1304.32; 1370.88	81.52; 85.68	2 GB; 4 GB	GDDR5; 128-bit	6000	96	60 W	PCIe 3.0 ×8
Radeon RX 550X (Polaris 12)	Apr 11, 2018 $79 USD	GCN 4 GloFo; 14LPP	2.2×10^{9} 101 mm^{2}	512:32:16; 8 CU	1100; 1287	35.2; 41.184	17.6; 20.592	1126.4; 1317.888	70.4; 82.368	2 GB; 4 GB	GDDR5; 128-bit	7000	112	50 W	PCIe 3.0 ×8
Radeon RX 550X 640SP (Polaris 11)	Apr 11, 2018; OEM	GCN 4 GloFo; 14LPP	3.0×10^{9} 123 mm^{2}	640:40:16; 10 CU	1019; 1071	40.76; 42.84	16.304; 17.136	1304.32; 1370.88	81.52; 85.68	2 GB; 4 GB	GDDR5; 128-bit	6000	96	60 W	PCIe 3.0 ×8
Radeon RX 560D (Polaris 21)	Jul 4, 2017; OEM and China Only	GCN 4 GloFo; 14LPP	3.0×10^{9} 123 mm^{2}	896:56:16; 14 CU	1090; 1175	61.0; 65.8	17,4; 18.8	1953; 2106	122,0; 131.6	2 GB; 4 GB	GDDR5; 128-bit	6000	96	65 W	PCIe 3.0 ×8
Radeon RX 560 (Note: In October 2017 AMD branded an additional Polaris chip as "RX 560", although it features fewer shader and texture mapping units than the first released RX 560.) (Polaris 21)	Jul 4, 2017 $99 USD	GCN 4 GloFo; 14LPP	3.0×10^{9} 123 mm^{2}	896:56:16; 14 CU	1090; 1175	61.0; 65.8	17.4; 18.8	1953; 2106	122.0; 131.6	2 GB; 4 GB	GDDR5; 128-bit	7000	112	60-80 W	PCIe 3.0 ×8
Radeon RX 560 (Polaris 21)	Apr 18, 2017 $99 USD	GCN 4 GloFo; 14LPP	3.0×10^{9} 123 mm^{2}	1024:64:16; 16 CU	1175; 1275	75.2; 81.6	18.8; 20.4	2406; 2611	150.4; 163.2	2 GB; 4 GB	GDDR5; 128-bit	7000	112	60-80 W	PCIe 3.0 ×8
Radeon RX 560 XT (Polaris 10/20)	Mar 13, 2019 China Only	GCN 4 GloFo; 14LPP	5.7×10^{9} 232 mm^{2}	1792:112:32 28 CU	973 1073	109.0 120.2	31.1 34.3	3487 3846	217.3 240.4	4 GB; 8 GB	GDDR5; 256-bit	6600	211	150 W	PCIe 3.0 ×16
Radeon RX 570 (Polaris 20)	Apr 18, 2017 $169 USD	GCN 4 GloFo; 14LPP	5.7×10^{9} 232 mm^{2}	2048:128:32; 32 CU	1168; 1244	149.5; 159.2	37.4; 39.8	4784; 5095	299.0; 318.4	4 GB; 8 GB	GDDR5; 256-bit	7000	224	150 W	PCIe 3.0 ×16
Radeon RX 580 2048SP (Polaris 20)	Oct 15, 2018; China Only	GCN 4 GloFo; 14LPP	5.7×10^{9} 232 mm^{2}	2048:128:32; 32 CU	1168; 1284	149.5; 159.2	37.4; 39.8	4784; 5095	299.0; 318.4	4 GB; 8 GB	GDDR5; 256-bit	7000	224	150 W	PCIe 3.0 ×16
Radeon RX 580 (Polaris 20)	Apr 18, 2017 $199 USD (4 GB) $229 USD (8 GB)	GCN 4 GloFo; 14LPP	5.7×10^{9} 232 mm^{2}	2304:144:32; 36 CU	1257; 1340	181.0; 193.0	40.2; 42.9	5792; 6175	362.0; 385.9	4 GB; 8 GB	GDDR5; 256-bit	8000	256	185 W	PCIe 3.0 ×16
Radeon RX 590 GME (Polaris 20)	March 9, 2020; China Only	GCN 4 GloFo; 14LPP	5.7×10^{9} 232 mm^{2}	2304:144:32; 36 CU	1257; 1380	181.0; 198.7	40.2; 44.2	5792; 6359	362.0; 397.4	8 GB	GDDR5; 256-bit	8000	256	175 W	PCIe 3.0 ×16
Radeon RX 590 (Polaris 30)	Nov 15, 2018 $279 USD	GCN 4 Samsung/GloFo; 12LP (14LP+) (Note: GlobalFoundries' 12 nm 12LP process is based on Samsung's 14 nm 14LPP process.)	5.7×10^{9} 232 mm^{2}	2304:144:32; 36 CU	1469; 1545	211.5; 222.5	47.0; 49.4	6769; 7120	423.0; 444.9	8 GB	GDDR5; 256-bit	8000	256	225 W	PCIe 3.0 ×16
Model (Code name)	Release Date & Price	Architecture & fab	Transistors & die size	Config	Clock (MHz)	Texture (GT/s)	Pixel (GP/s)	Single	Double	Size	Bus type & width	Clock (MT/s)	Bandwidth (GB/s)	TBP	Bus interface
Model (Code name)	Release Date & Price	Architecture & fab	Transistors & die size	Core		Fillrate		Processing power (GFLOPS)		Memory				TBP	Bus interface

=== Radeon RX Vega series ===
Model (Code name)	Release Date & Price	Architecture & fab	Transistors & die size	Core		Fillrate (Note: Boost values (if available) are stated below the base value in italic.) (Note: Texture fillrate is calculated as the number of Texture Mapping Units multiplied by the base (or boost) core clock speed.) (Note: Pixel fillrate is calculated as the number of Render Output Units multiplied by the base (or boost) core clock speed.)		Processing power (Note: Precision performance is calculated from the base (or boost) core clock speed based on a FMA operation.) (GFLOPS)			Memory				TBP	Bus interface
Model (Code name)	Release Date & Price	Architecture & fab	Transistors & die size	Config (Note: Unified shaders : Texture mapping units : Render output units and Compute units (CU))	Clock (MHz)	Texture (GT/s)	Pixel (GP/s)	Half	Single	Double	Size (GB)	Bandwidth (GB/s)	Bus type & width	Clock (MT/s)	TBP	Bus interface
Radeon RX Vega 56 (Vega 10)	Aug 28, 2017 $399 USD	GCN 5 GloFo; 14LPP (Note: GlobalFoundries' 14 nm 14LPP FinFET process is second-sourced from Samsung Electronics.)	12.5×10^{9} 486 mm^{2}	3584:224:64; 56 CU	1156; 1471	258.9; 329.5	73.98; 94.14	16,572; 21,088	8,286; 10,544	517.9; 659.0	8	409.6	HBM2; 2048-bit	1600	210 W	PCIe 3.0 ×16
Radeon RX Vega 64 (Vega 10)	Aug 14, 2017 $499 USD	GCN 5 GloFo; 14LPP	12.5×10^{9} 486 mm^{2}	4096:256:64; 64 CU	1247; 1546	319.2; 395.8	79.81; 98.94	20,431; 25,330	10,215; 12,665	638.5; 791.6	8	483.8	HBM2; 2048-bit	1890	295 W	PCIe 3.0 ×16
Radeon RX Vega 64 Liquid (Vega 10)	Aug 14, 2017 $699 USD	GCN 5 GloFo; 14LPP	12.5×10^{9} 486 mm^{2}	4096:256:64; 64 CU	1406; 1677	359.9; 429.3	89.98; 107.3	23,036; 27,476	11,518; 13,738	719.9; 858.6	8	483.8	HBM2; 2048-bit	1890	345 W	PCIe 3.0 ×16

=== Radeon VII series ===
Model (Code name)	Release Date & Price	Architecture & fab	Transistors & die size	Core		Fillrate (Note: Boost values (if available) are stated below the base value in italic.) (Note: Texture fillrate is calculated as the number of Texture Mapping Units multiplied by the base (or boost) core clock speed.) (Note: Pixel fillrate is calculated as the number of Render Output Units multiplied by the base (or boost) core clock speed.)		Processing power (Note: Precision performance is calculated from the base (or boost) core clock speed based on a FMA operation.) (GFLOPS)			Memory				TBP	Bus interface
Model (Code name)	Release Date & Price	Architecture & fab	Transistors & die size	Config (Note: Unified shaders : Texture mapping units : Render output units and Compute units (CU))	Clock (MHz)	Texture (GT/s)	Pixel (GP/s)	Half	Single	Double	Size (GB)	Bandwidth (GB/s)	Bus type & width	Clock (MT/s)	TBP	Bus interface
Radeon VII (Vega 20)	Feb 7, 2019 $699 USD	GCN 5 TSMC CLN7FF	13.23×10^{9} 331 mm^{2}	3840:240:64; 60 CU	1400; 1800	336.0; 420.0	89.60; 112.0	21,504; 27,648	10,752; 13,824	2,688; 3,459	16	1024	HBM2; 4096-bit	2000	300 W	PCIe 3.0 ×16

=== Radeon RX 5000 series ===
Model (Code name)	Release Date & Price	Architecture & fab	Transistors & die size	Core		Fillrate (Note: Boost values (if available) are stated below the base value in italic.) (Note: Texture fillrate is calculated as the number of Texture Mapping Units multiplied by the base (or boost) core clock speed.) (Note: Pixel fillrate is calculated as the number of Render Output Units multiplied by the base (or boost) core clock speed.)		Processing power (Note: Precision performance is calculated from the base (or boost) core clock speed based on a FMA operation.) (GFLOPS)			Memory				TBP	Bus interface
Model (Code name)	Release Date & Price	Architecture & fab	Transistors & die size	Config (Note: Unified shaders : Texture mapping units : Render output units and Compute units (CU))	Clock (MHz)	Texture (GT/s)	Pixel (GP/s)	Half	Single	Double	Size (GB)	Bandwidth (GB/s)	Bus type & width	Clock (MT/s)	TBP	Bus interface
Radeon RX 5300 (Navi 14)	Aug 28, 2020; OEM	RDNA; TSMC N7	6.4×10^{9} 158 mm^{2}	1408:88:32; 22 CU	1327; 1645	116.8; 144.8	42.46; 52.64	7,474; 9,265	3,737; 4,632	233.5; 289.5	3	168	GDDR6; 96-bit	14000	100 W	PCIe 4.0 ×8
Radeon RX 5300 XT (Navi 14)	Oct 7, 2019; OEM	RDNA; TSMC N7	6.4×10^{9} 158 mm^{2}	1408:88:32; 22 CU	1670; 1845	146.7; 162.4	53.44; 59.04	9,405; 10,390	4,703; 5,196	293.9; 324.7	4	112	GDDR5; 128-bit	7000	100 W	PCIe 4.0 ×8
Radeon RX 5500 (Navi 14)	Oct 7, 2019; OEM	RDNA; TSMC N7	6.4×10^{9} 158 mm^{2}	1408:88:32; 22 CU	1670; 1845	146.7; 162.4	53.44; 59.04	9,405; 10,390	4,703; 5,196	293.9; 324.7	4	224	GDDR6; 128-bit	14000	150 W	PCIe 4.0 ×8
Radeon RX 5500 XT (Navi 14)	Dec 7, 2019 $169 USD (4GB) $199 USD (8GB)	RDNA; TSMC N7	6.4×10^{9} 158 mm^{2}	1408:88:32; 22 CU	1717; 1845	151.1; 162.4	54.94; 59.04	9,670; 10,390	4,835; 5,196	302.2; 324.7	4; 8	224	GDDR6; 128-bit	14000	130 W	PCIe 4.0 ×8
Radeon RX 5600 (Navi 10)	Jan 21, 2020; OEM	RDNA; TSMC N7	10.3×10^{9} 251 mm^{2}	2048:128:64; 32 CU	1375; 1560	176.0; 199.7	88.00; 99.84	11,264; 12,780	5,632; 6,390	352.0; 399.4	6	288	GDDR6; 192-bit	12000	150 W	PCIe 4.0 ×16
Radeon RX 5600 XT (Navi 10)	Jan 21, 2020 $279 USD	RDNA; TSMC N7	10.3×10^{9} 251 mm^{2}	2304:144:64; 36 CU	1375; 1560	198.0; 224.6	88.00; 99.84	12,672; 14,377	6,336; 7,188	396.0; 449.3	6	288; 336	GDDR6; 192-bit	12000; 14000	160 W	PCIe 4.0 ×16
Radeon RX 5700 (Navi 10)	Jul 7, 2019 $349 USD	RDNA; TSMC N7	10.3×10^{9} 251 mm^{2}	2304:144:64; 36 CU	1465; 1725	210.9; 248.4	93.73; 110.4	13,501; 15,900	6,751; 7,949	421.9; 496.8	8	448	GDDR6; 256-bit	14000	180 W	PCIe 4.0 ×16
Radeon RX 5700 XT (Navi 10)	Jul 7, 2019 $399 USD	RDNA; TSMC N7	10.3×10^{9} 251 mm^{2}	2560:160:64; 40 CU	1605; 1905	256.8; 304.8	102.7; 121.9	16,435; 19,510	8,218; 9,754	513.6; 609.6	8	448	GDDR6; 256-bit	14000	225 W	PCIe 4.0 ×16
Radeon RX 5700 XT 50th Anniversary Edition (Navi 10)	Jul 7, 2019 $449 USD	RDNA; TSMC N7	10.3×10^{9} 251 mm^{2}	2560:160:64; 40 CU	1680; 1980	268.8; 316.8	107.5; 126.7	17,203; 20,276	8,602; 10,138	537.6; 633.6	8	448	GDDR6; 256-bit	14000	235 W	PCIe 4.0 ×16

=== Radeon RX 6000 series ===
Model (Code name)	Release Date & Price	Architecture & fab	Transistors & die size	Core		Fillrate (Note: Boost values (if available) are stated below the base value in italic.) (Note: Texture fillrate is calculated as the number of Texture Mapping Units multiplied by the base (or boost) core clock speed.) (Note: Pixel fillrate is calculated as the number of Render Output Units multiplied by the base (or boost) core clock speed.)		Processing power (Note: Precision performance is calculated from the base (or boost) core clock speed based on a FMA operation.) (GFLOPS)			Infinity Cache		Memory				TBP	Bus interface
Model (Code name)	Release Date & Price	Architecture & fab	Transistors & die size	Config (Note: Unified shaders : Texture mapping units : Render output units : Ray accelerators and Compute units (CU))	Clock (MHz)	Texture (GT/s)	Pixel (GP/s)	Half	Single	Double	Size	Bandwidth (GB/s)	Size	Bandwidth (GB/s)	Bus type & width	Clock (MT/s)	TBP	Bus interface
Radeon RX 6300 (Navi 24) (Note: Navi 24 lacks hardware video encoder.)	Jan 4, 2022 (Note: Actual release date unknown; RX 6300M release date is listed instead.); OEM	RDNA 2 TSMC N6	5.4×10^{9} 107 mm^{2}	768:48:32:12; 12 CU	1000; 2040	48; 97.9	32; 65.3	3,072; 6,267	1536; 3,133	96; 195.8	8 MB	104	2 GB	64	GDDR6; 32-bit	16000	32 W	PCIe 4.0 ×4
Radeon RX 6400 (Navi 24)	Jan 19, 2022 $159 USD	RDNA 2 TSMC N6	5.4×10^{9} 107 mm^{2}	768:48:32:12; 12 CU	1923; 2321	92.3; 111.4	61.5; 74.3	5,907; 7,130	2,954; 3,565	184.6; 222.8	16 MB	208	4 GB	128	GDDR6; 64-bit	16000	53 W	PCIe 4.0 ×4
Radeon RX 6500 XT (Navi 24)	Jan 19, 2022 $199 USD (4GB) $219 USD (8GB)	RDNA 2 TSMC N6	5.4×10^{9} 107 mm^{2}	1024:64:32:16; 16 CU	2310; 2815	147.8; 180.2	73.9; 90.1	9,462; 11,530	4,731; 5,765	295.6; 360.3	16 MB	232	4 GB; 8 GB	144	GDDR6; 64-bit	18000	107 W 113 W	PCIe 4.0 ×4
Radeon RX 6600 (Navi 23)	Oct 13, 2021 $329 USD	RDNA 2 TSMC N7	11.06×10^{9} 237 mm^{2}	1792:112:64:28; 28 CU	1626; 2491	182.3; 279	104.1; 159.4	11,658; 17,860	5,828; 8,928	364.2; 558	32 MB	412.9	8 GB	224	GDDR6; 128-bit	14000	132 W	PCIe 4.0 ×8
Radeon RX 6600 XT (Navi 23)	Aug 11, 2021 $379 USD	RDNA 2 TSMC N7	11.06×10^{9} 237 mm^{2}	2048:128:64:32; 32 CU	1968; 2589	251.9; 331.4	126; 165.7	16,122; 21,209	8,061; 10,605	503.8; 662.8	32 MB	444.9	8 GB	256	GDDR6; 128-bit	16000	160 W	PCIe 4.0 ×8
Radeon RX 6650 XT (Navi 23)	May 10, 2022 $399 USD	RDNA 2 TSMC N7	11.06×10^{9} 237 mm^{2}	2048:128:64:32; 32 CU	2055; 2635	263; 337.2	131.5; 168.6	16,835; 21,586	8,417; 10,793	526.1; 674.6	32 MB	468.9	8 GB	280	GDDR6; 128-bit	17500	180 W	PCIe 4.0 ×8
Radeon RX 6700 (Navi 22)	Jun 9, 2021	RDNA 2 TSMC N7	17.2×10^{9} 335 mm^{2}	2304:144:64:36; 36 CU	1941; 2450	279.5; 352.8	124.2; 156.8	17,888; 22,579	8,944; 11,290	559; 705.6	80 MB	1065	10 GB	320	GDDR6; 160-bit	16000	175 W	PCIe 4.0 ×16
Radeon RX 6750 GRE 10GB (Navi 22)	Oct 18, 2023 $269 USD	RDNA 2 TSMC N7	17.2×10^{9} 335 mm^{2}	2304:144:64:36; 36 CU	1941; 2450	279.5; 352.8	124.2; 156.8	17,888; 22,579	8,944; 11,290	559; 705.6	80 MB	1065	10 GB	320	GDDR6; 160-bit	16000	170 W	PCIe 4.0 ×16
Radeon RX 6700 XT (Navi 22)	Mar 18, 2021 $479 USD	RDNA 2 TSMC N7	17.2×10^{9} 335 mm^{2}	2560:160:64:40; 40 CU	2321; 2581	371.4; 413	148.5; 165.2	23,767; 26,429	11,884; 13,215	742.7; 825.9	96 MB	1278	12 GB	384	GDDR6; 192-bit	16000	230 W	PCIe 4.0 ×16
Radeon RX 6750 GRE 12GB (Navi 22)	Oct 18, 2023 $289 USD	RDNA 2 TSMC N7	17.2×10^{9} 335 mm^{2}	2560:160:64:40; 40 CU	2321; 2581	371.4; 413	148.5; 165.2	23,767; 26,429	11,884; 13,215	742.7; 825.9	96 MB	1278	12 GB	384	GDDR6; 192-bit	16000	230 W	PCIe 4.0 ×16
Radeon RX 6750 XT (Navi 22)	May 10, 2022 $549 USD	RDNA 2 TSMC N7	17.2×10^{9} 335 mm^{2}	2560:160:64:40; 40 CU	2150; 2600	344; 416	137.6; 166.4	22,016; 26,624	11,008; 13,312	688; 832	96 MB	1326	12 GB	432	GDDR6; 192-bit	18000	250 W	PCIe 4.0 ×16
Radeon RX 6800 (Navi 21)	Nov 18, 2020 $579 USD	RDNA 2 TSMC N7	26.8×10^{9} 520 mm^{2}	3840:240:96:60; 60 CU	1700; 2105	408; 505.2	163.2; 202.1	26,112; 32,333	13,056; 16,166	816; 1,010	128 MB	1432.6	16 GB	512	GDDR6; 256-bit	16000	250 W	PCIe 4.0 ×16
Radeon RX 6800 XT (Navi 21)	Nov 18, 2020 $649 USD	RDNA 2 TSMC N7	26.8×10^{9} 520 mm^{2}	4608:288:128:72; 72 CU	1825; 2250	525.6; 648	233.6; 288	33,638; 41,472	16,819; 20,736	1,051; 1,296	128 MB	1664.2	16 GB	512	GDDR6; 256-bit	16000	300 W	PCIe 4.0 ×16
Radeon RX 6900 XT (Navi 21)	Dec 8, 2020 $999 USD	RDNA 2 TSMC N7	26.8×10^{9} 520 mm^{2}	5120:320:128:80; 80 CU	1825; 2250	584; 720	233.6; 288	37,376; 46,080	18,688; 23,040	1,168; 1,440	128 MB	1664.2	16 GB	512	GDDR6; 256-bit	16000	300 W	PCIe 4.0 ×16
Radeon RX 6950 XT (Navi 21)	May 10, 2022 $1,099 USD	RDNA 2 TSMC N7	26.8×10^{9} 520 mm^{2}	5120:320:128:80; 80 CU	1890; 2310	604.8; 739.2	241.9; 295.7	38,707; 47,309	19,354; 23,654	1,210; 1,478	128 MB	1793.5	16 GB	576	GDDR6; 256-bit	18000	335 W	PCIe 4.0 ×16

=== Radeon RX 7000 series ===
Model (Code name)	Release Date & Price	Architecture & fab	Chiplets	Transistors & die size (Note: Approximate die size of all active dies (one GCD and up to six MCD).)	Core		Fillrate (Note: Boost values (if available) are stated below the base value in italic.) (Note: Texture fillrate is calculated as the number of Texture Mapping Units multiplied by the base (or boost) core clock speed.) (Note: Pixel fillrate is calculated as the number of Render Output Units multiplied by the base (or boost) core clock speed.)		Processing power (Note: Precision performance is calculated from the base (or boost) core clock speed based on a FMA operation.) (TFLOPS)			Infinity Cache		Memory				TBP	Bus interface
Model (Code name)	Release Date & Price	Architecture & fab	Chiplets	Transistors & die size	Config (Note: Unified shaders : Texture mapping units : Render output units : Ray accelerators : AI accelerators and Compute Units (CU))	Clock (MHz)	Texture (GT/s)	Pixel (GP/s)	Half (Note: Officially declared half-precision performance is twice of the one shown here due to being based on different operation (a×b+c×d+e).)	Single	Double	Size	Bandwidth (GB/s)	Size	Bandwidth (GB/s)	Bus type & width	Clock (MT/s)	TBP	Bus interface
Radeon RX 7400 (Navi 33)	Aug 10, 2025; OEM	RDNA 3 TSMC N6	Monolithic	13.3×10^{9} 204 mm^{2}	1792:112:64:28:56; 28 CU	1100			15.77	7.88	0.123	32 MB	362	8 GB	173	GDDR6; 128-bit	10800	55 W	PCIe 4.0 ×8
Steam Machine GPU (Navi 33)	Jun 22, 2026; OEM	RDNA 3 TSMC N6	Monolithic	13.3×10^{9} 204 mm^{2}	1792:112:64:28:56; 28 CU	2450			35.12	17.56	0.274	32 MB		8 GB		GDDR6; 128-bit		110 W	PCIe 4.0 ×8
Radeon RX 7600 (Navi 33)	May 25, 2023 $269 USD	RDNA 3 TSMC N6	Monolithic	13.3×10^{9} 204 mm^{2}	2048:128:64:32:64; 32 CU	1720; 2655	220.2; 339.8	110.1; 169.9	14.09; 21.75	14.09; 21.75	0.220; 0.340	32 MB	476.9	8 GB	288	GDDR6; 128-bit	18000	165 W	PCIe 4.0 ×8
Radeon RX 7650 GRE (Navi 33)	Feb 7, 2025; China Only ¥2,049 RMB ($249 USD)	RDNA 3 TSMC N6	Monolithic	13.3×10^{9} 204 mm^{2}	2048:128:64:32:64; 32 CU	1720; 2695	220.2; 345.0	110.1; 172.5	14.09; 22.08	14.09; 22.08	0.220; 0.345	32 MB	476.9	8 GB	288	GDDR6; 128-bit	18000	170 W	PCIe 4.0 ×8
Radeon RX 7600 XT (Navi 33)	Jan 24, 2024 $329 USD	RDNA 3 TSMC N6	Monolithic	13.3×10^{9} 204 mm^{2}	2048:128:64:32:64; 32 CU	1720; 2755	220.2; 352.6	110.1; 176.3	14.09; 22.57	14.09; 22.57	0.220; 0.353	32 MB	476.9	16 GB	288	GDDR6; 128-bit	18000	190 W	PCIe 4.0 ×8
Radeon RX 7700 (Navi 32)	Sep 18, 2025; OEM	RDNA 3 TSMC N5 (GCD); TSMC N6 (MCD)	1 × GCD; 4 × MCD	28.1×10^{9} 346 mm^{2}	2560:160:64:40:80; 40 CU	1900; 2459	304; 393.4	121.6; 157.4	19.47; 25.20	19.47; 25.20	0.304; 0.394	40 MB	1927	16 GB	624	GDDR6; 256-bit	19500	263 W	PCIe 4.0 ×16
Radeon RX 7700 XT (Navi 32)	Sep 6, 2023 $449 USD	RDNA 3 TSMC N5 (GCD); TSMC N6 (MCD)	1 × GCD; 3 × MCD	28.1×10^{9} 346 mm^{2}	3456:216:96:54:108; 54 CU	1900; 2544	410.4; 549.5	182.4; 244.2	26.27; 35.17	26.27; 35.17	0.410; 0.550	48 MB	1995	12 GB	432	GDDR6; 192-bit	18000	245 W	PCIe 4.0 ×16
Radeon RX 7800 XT (Navi 32)	Sep 6, 2023 $499 USD	RDNA 3 TSMC N5 (GCD); TSMC N6 (MCD)	1 × GCD; 4 × MCD	28.1×10^{9} 346 mm^{2}	3840:240:96:60:120; 60 CU	1800; 2430	432; 583.2	172.8; 233.2	27.64; 37.32	27.64; 37.32	0.432; 0.583	64 MB	2708	16 GB	624	GDDR6; 256-bit	19500	263 W	PCIe 4.0 ×16
Radeon RX 7900 GRE (Navi 31)	Jul 27, 2023; China only, Feb 27, 2024 $549 USD	RDNA 3 TSMC N5 (GCD); TSMC N6 (MCD)	1 × GCD; 4 × MCD	57.7×10^{9} 529 mm^{2}	5120:320:160:80:160; 80 CU	1270; 2245	406.4; 718.4	243.8; 431.0	26.01; 45.98	26.01; 45.98	0.406; 0.718	64 MB	2250	16 GB	576	GDDR6; 256-bit	18000	260 W	PCIe 4.0 ×16
Radeon RX 7900 XT (Navi 31)	Dec 13, 2022 $899 USD	RDNA 3 TSMC N5 (GCD); TSMC N6 (MCD)	1 × GCD; 5 × MCD	57.7×10^{9} 529 mm^{2}	5376:336:192:84:168; 84 CU	1500; 2400	504.0; 806.4	288.0; 460.8	32.26; 51.61	32.26; 51.61	0.504; 0.806	80 MB	2900	20 GB	800	GDDR6; 320-bit	20000	315 W	PCIe 4.0 ×16
Radeon RX 7900 XTX (Navi 31)	Dec 13, 2022 $999 USD	RDNA 3 TSMC N5 (GCD); TSMC N6 (MCD)	1 × GCD; 6 × MCD	57.7×10^{9} 529 mm^{2}	6144:384:192:96:192; 96 CU	1900; 2500	729.6; 960.0	364.8; 480.0	46.69; 61.44	46.69; 61.44	0.730; 0.960	96 MB	3500	24 GB	960	GDDR6; 384-bit	20000	355 W	PCIe 4.0 ×16

=== Radeon RX 9000 series ===
Model (Code name)	Release date & price	Architecture & fab	Transistors & die size	Core		Fillrate (Note: Boost values (if available) are stated below the base value in italic.) (Note: Texture fillrate is calculated as the number of Texture Mapping Units multiplied by the base (or boost) core clock speed.) (Note: Pixel fillrate is calculated as the number of Render Output Units multiplied by the base (or boost) core clock speed.)		Processing power					Infinity Cache		Memory				TBP	Bus interface
Model (Code name)	Release date & price	Architecture & fab	Transistors & die size	Core		Fillrate		TFLOPS (Note: Precision performance is calculated from the base (or boost) core clock speed based on a FMA operation.)			AI TOPS (Note: Officially declared performance is twice the one shown here due to the use of sparsity.)		Infinity Cache		Memory				TBP	Bus interface
Model (Code name)	Release date & price	Architecture & fab	Transistors & die size	Config (Note: Unified shaders : Texture mapping units : Render output units : Ray accelerators : AI accelerators and Compute units (CU))	Clock (MHz)	Texture (GT/s)	Pixel (GP/s)	Half (Note: Formerly officially declared performance is twice the one shown here due to the use of a different operation (a×b+c×d+e).)	Single	Double	INT8	INT4	Size	Bandwidth (GB/s)	Size	Bandwidth (GB/s)	Bus type & width	Clock (MT/s)	TBP	Bus interface
Radeon RX 9050 (Navi 44)	Jul 28, 2026 (APAC/JP/LATAM) $279 USD	RDNA 4 TSMC N4P	29.7 billion 199 mm^{2}	1024:64:64:16:32; 16 CU	1920; 2600	? 166.4	? 166.4	? 10.56	? 10.56	? 0.166	? 85	? 170	16 MB; 32 MB		4 GB; 8 GB	144; 288	GDDR6 64-bit GDDR6 128-bit	18000	92 W	PCIe 5.0 ×16
Radeon RX 9060 (Navi 44)	Aug 5, 2025; OEM	RDNA 4 TSMC N4P	29.7 billion 199 mm^{2}	1792:112:64:28:56; 28 CU	1700; 2990	190.4; 334.9	108.8; 191.4	12.19; 21.43	12.19; 21.43	0.190; 0.335	97; 171	195; 343	32 MB		8 GB	288	GDDR6 128-Bit	18000	132 W	PCIe 5.0 ×16
Radeon RX 9060 XT (Navi 44)	Jun 5, 2025 $299 USD (8 GB) $349 USD (16 GB)	RDNA 4 TSMC N4P	29.7 billion 199 mm^{2}	2048:128:64:32:64; 32 CU	2530; 3130	323.8; 400.6	161.9; 200.3	20.72; 25.64	20.72; 25.64	0.323; 0.400	166; 205	331; 410	32 MB		8 GB; 16 GB	320	GDDR6 128-Bit	20000	150 W 160 W	PCIe 5.0 ×16
Radeon RX 9070 GRE (Navi 48)	May, 2025 ¥4119 RMB	RDNA 4 TSMC N4P	53.9 billion 356.5 mm^{2}	3072:192:96:48:96; 48 CU	2200; 2790	422.4; 535.7	211.2; 267.8	27.03; 34.28	27.03; 34.28	0.422; 0.535	216; 274	432; 548	48 MB		12 GB	432	GDDR6; 192-bit	18000	220 W	PCIe 5.0 ×16
Radeon RX 9070 (Navi 48)	Mar 6, 2025 $549 USD	RDNA 4 TSMC N4P	53.9 billion 356.5 mm^{2}	3584:224:128:56:112; 56 CU	2070; 2520	463.6; 564.4	265.0; 322.6	29.67; 36.12	29.67; 36.12	0.463; 0.564	237; 289	475; 578	64 MB		16 GB	640	GDDR6; 256-bit	20000	220 W	PCIe 5.0 ×16
Radeon RX 9070 XT (Navi 48)	Mar 6, 2025 $599 USD	RDNA 4 TSMC N4P	53.9 billion 356.5 mm^{2}	4096:256:128:64:128; 64 CU	2400; 2970	614.4; 760.3	307.2; 380.2	39.32; 48.66	39.32; 48.66	0.614; 0.760	314; 389	629; 778	64 MB		16 GB	640	GDDR6; 256-bit	20000	304 W	PCIe 5.0 ×16

== Mobile GPUs ==
These GPUs are either integrated into the mainboard or occupy a Mobile PCI Express Module (MXM).

=== Rage Mobility series ===
Model	Launch	Fab (nm)	Bus interface	Core clock (MHz)	Memory clock (MHz)	Hardware T&L	Core config^{1}	Fillrate		Memory				API compliance (version)		Notes
Model	Launch	Fab (nm)	Bus interface	Core clock (MHz)	Memory clock (MHz)	Hardware T&L	Core config^{1}	Pixel (GP/s)	Texture (GT/s)	Size (MB)	Bandwidth (GB/s)	Bus type	Bus width (bit)	Direct3D	OpenGL	Notes
Rage LT (Rage II)	Nov 1996	500	PCI	60	66	No	0:1:1:1	0.06	0.06	4	0.53	EDO, SDR, SGR	64	5	N/A	
Rage LT Pro (Rage Pro)	Nov 1997	350	AGP, PCI	75	100	No	0:1:1:1	0.075	0.075	8	0.80	EDO, SDR, SGR	64	6	1.1	Motion compensation
Rage Mobility M/P (Rage Pro)	Nov 1998	250	AGP, PCI	90	Unknown	No	0:1:1:1	0.18	0.18	8	Unknown	SDR, SGR	64	Unknown	Unknown	M had 4 MB of integrated SDRAM, P had none. IDCT, motion compensation.
Rage Mobility M1 (Rage Pro)	Feb 1999	250	AGP, PCI	90	90	No	0:1:1:1	0.18	0.18	8	0.72	SDR	64	6	1.2	M1 had 8 MB of integrated SDRAM, P had none. IDCT, motion compensation.
Rage 128 GL	Aug 1998	250	AGP, PCI	103	103	No	0:2:2:2	0.206	0.206	32	1.65	SDR	128	6	1.2	
Rage Mobility 128 (Rage 128 Pro)	Oct 1999	250	AGP, PCI	105	105	No	0:2:2:2	0.21	0.21	16	2.28	SDR	128	6	1.2	IDCT, Motion Compensation
Rage Mobility M3 (AGP 4×) (Rage 128 Pro)	Oct 1999	250	AGP, PCI	105	105	No	0:2:2:2	0.21	0.21	16	2.28	SDR	128	6	1.2	M3 had 8 MB of integrated SDRAM, IDCT, Motion Compensation.
Rage Mobility M4 (AGP 4×) (Rage 128 Pro)	Oct 1999	250	AGP, PCI	105	105	No	0:2:2:2	0.21	0.21	32	2.28	SDR	128	6	1.2	M4 had 16 MB of integrated SDRAM, IDCT, Motion Compensation.

^{1} Vertex shaders : Pixel shaders : Texture mapping units : Render output units.

=== Mobility Radeon series ===
Model	Launch	Model number	Code name	Fab (nm)	Bus interface	Core clock (MHz)	Memory clock (MHz)	Core config^{1}	Fillrate		Memory				API compliance (version)		Notes
Model	Launch	Model number	Code name	Fab (nm)	Bus interface	Core clock (MHz)	Memory clock (MHz)	Core config^{1}	Pixel (GP/s)	Texture (GT/s)	Size (MB)	Bandwidth (GB/s)	Bus type	Bus width (bit)	Direct3D	OpenGL	Notes
Mobility Radeon 7000	Feb 2001	M6	RV100	180	AGP 4×	144; 167	144; 183	0:1:3:1	0.167	0.5	8; 16; 32	1.464; 2.928	SDR; DDR	32; 64	7	1.3	
Mobility Radeon 7500	Dec 2001	M7	RV200	150	AGP 4×	280	200	1:2:6:2	0.56	1.68	32; 64	3.2; 6.4	DDR	64; 128	7	1.3	PowerPlay II, DX7 T&L
Mobility Radeon 9000	Aug 2002	M9	RV250	150	AGP 4×	250	200	1:4:4:4	1.0	1.0	32; 64	3.2; 6.4	DDR	64; 128	8.1	1.4	PowerPlay 3.0, Fullstream
Mobility Radeon 9200	Mar 2003	M9+	RV280	150	AGP 8×	250/250	200/220	1:4:4:4	1.0	1.0	32; 64	3.2/3.52; 6.4/7.04	DDR	64; 128	8.1	1.4	PowerPlay 3.0, Fullstream
Mobility Radeon 9500	2004?	M11	RV360	130	AGP 8×	Unknown	Unknown	2:4:4:4	Unknown	Unknown	64	Unknown	DDR	64; 128	9.0	2.0	
Mobility Radeon 9550	2005	M12	RV360	130	AGP 8×	210	183	2:4:4:4	0.84	0.84	64	2.928; 5.856	DDR	64; 128	9.0	2.0	
Mobility Radeon 9600	Mar 2003	M10, M11	RV350	130	AGP 8×	300	300	2:4:4:4	1.2	1.2	64; 128	4.8; 9.6	DDR	64; 128	9.0	2.0	
Mobility Radeon 9600 Pro	2004	M10	RV350	130	AGP 8×	350	350	2:4:4:4	1.4	1.4	128	11.2	DDR	128	9.0	2.0	
Mobility Radeon 9700	Feb 2004	M11	RV360	130	AGP 8×	450	275	2:4:4:4	1.8	1.8	128	8.8	DDR	128	9.0	2.0	
Mobility Radeon 9800	Sep 2004	M18	R420	130	AGP 8×	350	300	4:8:8:8	2.8	2.8	256	19.2	DDR	256	9.0	2.0	

^{1} Vertex shaders : Pixel shaders : Texture mapping units : Render output units.

=== Mobility Radeon X300, X600, X700, X800 series ===
Model	Launch	Model number	Code name	Fab (nm)	Bus interface	Core clock (MHz)	Memory clock (MHz)	Core config^{1}	Fillrate		Memory				API compliance (version)		Notes
Model	Launch	Model number	Code name	Fab (nm)	Bus interface	Core clock (MHz)	Memory clock (MHz)	Core config^{1}	Pixel (GP/s)	Texture (GT/s)	Size (MB)	Bandwidth (GB/s)	Bus type	Bus width (bit)	Direct3D	OpenGL	Notes
Mobility Radeon X300	Nov 2005	M22	RV370	110	PCIe ×16	350	250	2:4:4:4	1.4	1.4	128	4	DDR	64	9.0b	2.0	Powerplay 5.0
Mobility Radeon X600	Jun 2004	M24	RV380	130	PCIe ×16	400	250	2:4:4:4	1.6	1.6	64, 128	8	DDR	128	9.0b	2.0	
Mobility Radeon X700	Mar 2005	M26	RV410	110	PCIe ×16	400-100 (PowerPlay)	350-200	6:8:8:4	1.4	2.8	Shared-128? 64, 128	11.2	DDR, GDDR3	128	9.0b	2.0	3DC, dynamic lane count switching
Mobility Radeon X800	Nov 2004	M28	R423	130	PCIe ×16	400	400	6:12:12:12	4.8	4.8	256	25.6	GDDR3	256	9.0b	2.0	3DC, DLCS, Clock Gating
Mobility Radeon X800 XT	Jun 2005	M28 PRO	R423	130	PCIe ×16	480	550	6:16:16:16	7.68	7.68	256	35.2	GDDR3	256	9.0b	2.0	3DC, DLCS, Clock Gating

^{1} Vertex shaders : Pixel shaders : Texture mapping units : Render output units.

=== Mobility Radeon X1000 series ===
Model	Launch	Model number	Code name	Fab (nm)	Bus interface	Core clock (MHz)	Memory clock (MHz)	Core config^{1}	Fillrate		Memory				API compliance (version)		Notes
Model	Launch	Model number	Code name	Fab (nm)	Bus interface	Core clock (MHz)	Memory clock (MHz)	Core config^{1}	Pixel (GP/s)	Texture (GT/s)	Size (MB)	Bandwidth (GB/s)	Bus type	Bus width (bit)	Direct3D	OpenGL	Notes
Mobility Radeon X1300	January 19, 2006	M52	RV515	90	PCIe ×16	350	250	2:4:4:4	1.4	1.4	128 + shared	8	DDR DDR2	128	9.0c	2.0	
Mobility Radeon X1350	September 18, 2006	M62	RV515	90	PCIe ×16	470	350	2:4:4:4	1.88	1.88	128 + shared	11.2	DDR2 GDDR3	128	9.0c	2.0	
Mobility Radeon X1400	January 19, 2006	M54	RV515	90	PCIe ×16	445	250	2:4:4:4	1.78	1.78	128 + shared	8	DDR DDR2	128	9.0c	2.0	
Mobility Radeon X1450	September 18, 2006	M64	RV515	90	PCIe ×16	550	450	2:4:4:4	2.2	2.2	128 + shared	14.4	DDR2 GDDR3	128	9.0c	2.0	
Mobility Radeon X1600	February 1, 2006	M56	RV530	90	PCIe ×16	425; 450	375; 470	5:12:4:4	1.7; 1.8	1.7; 1.8	256	12.0; 15.04	DDR2; GDDR3	128	9.0c	2.0	
Mobility Radeon X1700	February 1, 2006	M66	RV535	90	PCIe ×16	475	400; 550	5:12:4:4	1.9	1.9	256	11.2; 17.6	DDR2; GDDR3	128	9.0c	2.0	strained silicon
Mobility Radeon X1800	March 1, 2006	M58	R520	90	PCIe ×16	450	500	8:12:12:12	5.4	5.4	256	32	GDDR3	256	9.0c	2.0	
Mobility Radeon X1800 XT	March 1, 2006	M58	R520	90	PCIe ×16	550	650	8:16:16:16	8.8	8.8	256	41.6	GDDR3	256	9.0c	2.0	
Mobility Radeon X1900	January 11, 2007	M68	RV570	80	PCIe ×16	400	470	8:36:12:12	4.8	4.8	256	30.08	GDDR3	256	9.0c	2.0	PowerPlay 6.0

^{1} Vertex shaders : Pixel shaders : Texture mapping units : Render output units.

=== Mobility Radeon HD 2000 series ===
OpenGL 3.3 is possible with latest drivers for all RV6xx.

Model	Launch	Model number	Code name	Fab (nm)	Bus interface	Core clock (MHz)	Memory clock (MHz)	Core config	Fillrate		Memory				API compliance (version)		Processing power (GFLOPS)	Notes
Model	Launch	Model number	Code name	Fab (nm)	Bus interface	Core clock (MHz)	Memory clock (MHz)	Core config	Pixel (GP/s)	Texture (GT/s)	Size (MB)	Bandwidth (GB/s)	Bus type	Bus width (bit)	Direct3D	OpenGL	Processing power (GFLOPS)	Notes
Mobility Radeon X2300	March 1, 2007	M64	RV515	90	PCIe ×16	480	400	2:4:4:4^{1}	1.92	1.92	128	6.4; 12.8	DDR; DDR2; GDDR3	64; 128	9.0c	2.0	Unknown	renamed product, HyperMemory, no UVD, PowerPlay 6.0
Mobility Radeon X2500	June 1, 2007	M66	RV530	90	PCIe ×16	460	400	5:12:4:4^{1}	1.84	1.84	256	12.8	DDR; DDR2; GDDR3	128	9.0c	2.0	Unknown	based on X1600/1700, HM up to 768 Mb, no UVD, PowerPlay 6.0
Mobility Radeon HD 2300	March 1, 2007	M71	RV515	90	PCIe ×16	480	400	2:4:4:4^{1}	1.92	1.92	128; 256; 512	6.4; 12.8	DDR; DDR2; GDDR3	64; 128	9.0c	2.0	Unknown	same as X2300, but with UVD, PowerPlay 6.0
Mobility Radeon HD 2400	May 14, 2007	M72S	RV610	65	PCIe ×16	450	400	40:4:4^{2}	1.8	1.8	256+ Hyper Memory	6.4	DDR2	64	10.0	2.0 (3.3)	36	UVD, PowerPlay 7.0
Mobility Radeon HD 2400 XT	May 14, 2007	M72M	RV610	65	PCIe ×16	600; 600	400; 700	40:4:4^{2}	2.4	2.4	256+ Hyper Memory	6.4; 11.2	DDR2; GDDR3	64	10.0	2.0 (3.3)	48	UVD, PowerPlay 7.0
Mobility Radeon HD 2600	May 14, 2007	M76M	RV630	65	PCIe ×16	500; 500	400; 600	120:8:4^{2}	2.0	4.0	256+ Hyper Memory	12.8; 19.2	DDR2; GDDR3	128	10.0	2.0 (3.3)	120	UVD, PowerPlay 7.0
Mobility Radeon HD 2600 XT	May 14, 2007	M76XT	RV630	65	PCIe ×16	680	750	120:8:4^{2}	2.72	5.44	256+ Hyper Memory	24	GDDR3	128	10.0	2.0 (3.3)	168	UVD, PowerPlay 7.0
Mobility Radeon HD 2700	December 12, 2007	M76	RV630	65	PCIe ×16	650	700	120:8:4^{2}	2.6	5.2	256+ Hyper Memory (total 768)	22.4	GDDR3	128	10.0	2.0 (3.3)	168	UVD, PowerPlay 7.0

^{1} Vertex shaders : Pixel shaders : Texture mapping units : Render output units.
^{2} Unified Shaderss : Texture mapping units : Render output units

=== Mobility Radeon HD 3000 series ===
Model	Launch	Model number	Code name	Fab (nm)	Bus interface	Core clock (MHz)	Memory clock (MHz)	Core config^{1}	Fillrate		Memory				API compliance (version)		Processing power (GFLOPS)	TDP (Watts)	Notes
Model	Launch	Model number	Code name	Fab (nm)	Bus interface	Core clock (MHz)	Memory clock (MHz)	Core config^{1}	Pixel (GP/s)	Texture (GT/s)	Size (MB)	Bandwidth (GB/s)	Bus type	Bus width (bit)	Direct3D	OpenGL	Processing power (GFLOPS)	TDP (Watts)	Notes
Mobility Radeon HD 3100	August 1, 2008	RS780MC	RV620	55	PCIe ×16 1.1	300	800 (system memory)	40:4:4	1.2	1.2	up to 512 from system memory	6.4/12.8	DDR2	64/128	10.1	2.0 (3.3)	24		UVD, PowerPlay 7.0
Mobility Radeon HD 3200	June 4, 2008	RS780MC	RV620	55	PCIe ×16 1.1	500	800 (system memory)	40:4:4	2	2	up to 512 from system memory	6.4/12.8	DDR2	64/128	10.1	2.0 (3.3)	40		UVD, PowerPlay 7.0
Mobility Radeon HD 3410	July 25, 2008	M82-MPE	RV620	55	PCIe ×16 1.1	400	400	40:4:4	1.6	1.6	256, 512	6.4	DDR2	64	10.1	2.0 (3.3)	32		UVD, PowerPlay 7.0
Mobility Radeon HD 3430	July 25, 2008	M82-SE	RV620	55	PCIe ×16 2.0	450	400	40:4:4	1.8	1.8	256	6.4	DDR2	64	10.1	2.0 (3.3)	36		UVD, PowerPlay 7.0
Mobility Radeon HD 3450	January 7, 2008	M82	RV620	55	PCIe ×16 2.0	500	400; 700	40:4:4	2	2	256	6.4; 11.2	DDR2; GDDR3	64	10.1	2.0 (3.3)	40		UVD, PowerPlay 7.0
Mobility Radeon HD 3470	January 7, 2008	M82-XT	RV620	55	PCIe ×16 2.0	680	400; 800	40:4:4	2.72	2.72	256	6.4; 12.8	DDR2; GDDR3	64	10.1	2.0 (3.3)	54.4		UVD, PowerPlay 7.0
Mobility Radeon HD 3650	January 7, 2008	M86	RV635	55	PCIe ×16 2.0	500	500; 700	120:8:4	2	4	512; 1024	16.0; 22.4	DDR2; GDDR3; GDDR4	128	10.1	3.3	120		UVD, PowerPlay 7.0
Mobility Radeon HD 3670	January 7, 2008	M86-XT	RV635	55	PCIe ×16 2.0	680	800	120:8:4	2.72	5.44	512; 1024	25.6	DDR2; GDDR3; GDDR4	128	10.1	2.0 (3.3)	163.2	30	UVD, PowerPlay 7.0
Mobility Radeon HD 3850	June 4, 2008	M88-L/M88-LP	RV670	55	PCIe ×16 2.0	580	750	320:16:16	9.28	9.28	512	48.0	GDDR3	256	10.1	2.0 (3.3)	371.2		UVD, PowerPlay 7.0
Mobility Radeon HD 3870	June 4, 2008	M88-LXT	RV670	55	PCIe ×16 2.0	660	850	320:16:16	10.56	10.56	512	54.4	GDDR3	256	10.1	2.0 (3.3)	422.4	55	UVD, PowerPlay 7.0
Mobility Radeon HD 3850 X2	June 5, 2008	2× M88-L/M88-LP	R680	55	PCIe ×16 2.0	580	750	2x [320:16:16]	2× 9.28	2× 9.28	2× 512	2× 48.0	GDDR3	2× 256	10.1	2.0 (3.3)	2× 371.2		UVD, PowerPlay 7.0
Mobility Radeon HD 3870 X2	September 1, 2008	2× M88-LXT	R680	55	PCIe ×16 2.0	660	850	2x [320:16:16]	2× 10.56	2× 10.56	2× 512	2× 54.4	GDDR3	2× 256	10.1	2.0 (3.3)	2× 422.4	110	UVD, PowerPlay 7.0

^{1} Unified Shaders : Texture mapping units : Render output units

=== Mobility Radeon HD 4000 series ===
Model	Launch	Model Number	Code name	Fab (nm)	Bus interface	Core clock (MHz)	Memory clock (MHz)	Core config^{1}	Fillrate		Memory				API compliance (version)		Processing power (GFLOPS)	Notes
Model	Launch	Model Number	Code name	Fab (nm)	Bus interface	Core clock (MHz)	Memory clock (MHz)	Core config^{1}	Pixel (GP/s)	Texture (GT/s)	Size (MB)	Bandwidth (GB/s)	Bus type	Bus width (bit)	Direct3D	OpenGL	Processing power (GFLOPS)	Notes
Mobility Radeon HD 4200	September 10, 2009	Unknown	RV620	55	Internal PCIe x16 1.1	500	800 (system memory)	40:4:4	2	2	up to 512 from system memory	6.4/12.8	DDR2 DDR3	64/128	10.1	3.3	40	UVD2, PowerPlay 7.0
Mobility Radeon HD 4225	May 1, 2010	Unknown	RV620	55	Internal PCIe x16 1.1	380	800 (system memory)	40:4:4	1.52	1.52	up to 512 from system memory	6.4/12.8	DDR2 DDR3	64/128	10.1	3.3	30.4	UVD2, PowerPlay 7.0
Mobility Radeon HD 4250	May 1, 2010	Unknown	RV620	55	Internal PCIe x16 1.1	500	800 (system memory)	40:4:4	2	2	up to 512 from system memory	6.4/12.8	DDR2 DDR3	64/128	10.1	3.3	40	UVD2, PowerPlay 7.0
Mobility Radeon HD 4270	May 1, 2010	Unknown	RV620	55	Internal PCIe x16 1.1	590	800 (system memory)	40:4:4	2.36	2.36	up to 512 from system memory	6.4/12.8	DDR2 DDR3	64/128	10.1	3.3	47.2	UVD2, PowerPlay 7.0
Mobility Radeon HD 4330	January 9, 2009	M92	RV710	55	PCIe ×16 2.0	450	600	80:8:4	1.8	3.6	512	9.6	DDR2; DDR3; GDDR3	64	10.1	3.3	72	UVD2, PowerPlay 7.0
Mobility Radeon HD 4530	January 9, 2009	M92	RV710	55	PCIe ×16 2.0	500	700	80:8:4	2	4	512	11.2	DDR2; DDR3; GDDR3	64	10.1	3.3	80	UVD2, PowerPlay 7.0
Mobility Radeon HD 4550	January 1, 2010	M92	RV710	55	PCIe ×16 2.0	550	700	80:8:4	2.2	4.4	512	11.2	DDR2; DDR3; GDDR3	64	10.1	3.3	80	UVD2, PowerPlay 7.0
Mobility Radeon HD 4570	January 9, 2009	M92	RV710	55	PCIe ×16 2.0	680	800	80:8:4	2.72	5.44	512	12.8	DDR2; DDR3; GDDR3	64	10.1	3.3	108.8	UVD2, PowerPlay 7.0
Mobility Radeon HD 4650	January 9, 2009	M96	RV730	55	PCIe ×16 2.0	500; 550	600; 800	320:32:8	4; 4.4	16; 17.6	512; 1024	19.2; 25.6	DDR2; DDR3; GDDR3	128	10.1	3.3	320; 352	UVD2, PowerPlay 7.0
Mobility Radeon HD 4670	January 9, 2009	M96-XT	RV730	55	PCIe ×16 2.0	675	800	320:32:8	5.4	21.6	512; 1024	12.8; 25.6	DDR2; DDR3; GDDR3	128	10.1	3.3	432	UVD2, PowerPlay 7.0
Mobility Radeon HD 4830	March 3, 2009	M97	RV740	40	PCIe ×16 2.0	400/600; 400/600	800/900; 800/900	640:32:16	6.4/9.6; 6.4/9.6	12.8/19.2; 12.8/19.2	512; 1024	25.6/28.8; 25.6/28.8	GDDR3; DDR3	128	10.1	3.3	512/768; 512/768	UVD2, PowerPlay 7.0
Mobility Radeon HD 4850	January 9, 2009	M98	RV770	55	PCIe ×16 2.0	500	850; 700	800:40:16	8	20	1024	54.4; 89.6	GDDR3; GDDR5^{2}	256	10.1	3.3	800	UVD2, PowerPlay 7.0
Mobility Radeon HD 4860	March 3, 2009	M97	RV740	40	PCIe ×16 2.0	650	1000	640:32:16	10.4	20.8	1024	64.0	GDDR5^{2}	128	10.1	3.3	832	UVD2, PowerPlay 7.0
Mobility Radeon HD 4870	January 9, 2009	M98-XT	RV770	55	PCIe ×16 2.0	550	888; 700	800:40:16	8.8	22	512; 1024	56.832; 89.6	GDDR3; GDDR5^{2}	256	10.1	3.3	880	UVD2, PowerPlay 7.0
Mobility Radeon HD 4870 X2	January 9, 2009	M98-XT	RV770	55	PCIe ×16 2.0	550	700	2× [800:40:16]	2× 8.8	2× 22	2048	2× 89.6	GDDR5^{2}	2× 256	10.1	3.3	2× 880	UVD2, PowerPlay 7.0; Dual GPU solution

^{1} Unified shaders : Texture mapping units : Render output units
^{2} The effective data transfer rate of GDDR5 is quadruple its nominal clock, instead of double as it is with other DDR memory.

=== Mobility Radeon HD 5000 series ===
Model: Mobility Radeon	Launch	Model Number	Code name	Fab (nm)	Bus interface	Core clock (MHz)	Memory clock (MHz)	Core config^{1}	Fillrate		Memory				API compliance (version)		Processing power (GFLOPS)	TDP (Watts)
Model: Mobility Radeon	Launch	Model Number	Code name	Fab (nm)	Bus interface	Core clock (MHz)	Memory clock (MHz)	Core config^{1}	Pixel (GP/s)	Texture (GT/s)	Size (MB)	Bandwidth (GB/s)	Bus type	Bus width (bit)	Direct3D	OpenGL	Processing power (GFLOPS)	TDP (Watts)
Mobility Radeon HD 530v	May 5, 2010	M92	RV710	55	PCIe ×16 2.0	500	600	80:8:4	2	4	1024	9.6	DDR2; DDR3; GDDR3	64	10.1	3.3	80	10
Mobility Radeon HD 545v	May 5, 2010	M92	RV710	55	PCIe ×16 2.0	720	400 800	80:8:4	2.88	5.76	512 1024	6.4 12.8	DDR2; DDR3; GDDR3	64	10.1	3.3	115.2	15
Mobility Radeon HD 550v	May 5, 2010	M96	RV730	55	PCIe ×16 2.0	450	600	320:32:8	3.6	14.4	1024	19.2	DDR2; DDR3; GDDR3	128	10.1	3.3	288	10
Mobility Radeon HD 560v	May 5, 2010	M96	RV730	55	PCIe ×16 2.0	550	800	320:32:8	4.4	17.6	1024	25.6	DDR2; DDR3; GDDR3	128	10.1	3.3	352	15
Mobility Radeon HD 565v	May 5, 2010	M96-XT	RV730	55	PCIe ×16 2.0	675	800	320:32:8	5.4	21.6	1024	25.6	DDR2; DDR3; GDDR3	128	10.1	3.3	432	20
Mobility Radeon HD 5145	January 7, 2010	M92	RV710	55	PCIe ×16 2.0	720	900	80:8:4	2.88	5.76	1024	14.4	DDR3; GDDR3	64	10.1	3.3	115.2	15
Mobility Radeon HD 5165	January 7, 2010	M96	RV730	55	PCIe ×16 2.0	600	900	320:32:8	4.8	19.2	1024	28.8	DDR3; GDDR3	128	10.1	3.3	384	35
Mobility Radeon HD 5430	January 7, 2010	Park LP	Cedar (RV 810)	40	PCIe ×16 2.1	500; 550	800	80:8:4	2.0; 2.2	4.0; 4.4	1024	12.8	DDR3; GDDR3	64	11	4.4	80; 88	7
Mobility Radeon HD 5450	January 7, 2010	Park PRO	Cedar (RV 810)	40	PCIe ×16 2.1	675	800	80:8:4	2.7	5.4	1024	12.8	DDR3; GDDR3	64	11	4.4	108	11
Mobility Radeon HD 5470	January 7, 2010	Park XT	Cedar (RV 810)	40	PCIe ×16 2.1	750	800	80:8:4	3	6	1024; 512	12.8; 25.6	DDR3; GDDR3; GDDR5	64	11	4.4	120	13; 15
Mobility Radeon HD 5650	January 7, 2010	Madison PRO	Redwood (RV 830)	40	PCIe ×16 2.1	450; 650	800	400:20:8	3.6; 5.2	9.0; 13.0	1024	25.6	DDR3; GDDR3	128	11	4.4	360; 520	15; 19
Mobility Radeon HD 5730	January 7, 2010	Madison LP	Redwood (RV 830)	40	PCIe ×16 2.1	650	800	400:20:8	5.2	13	1024	25.6	DDR3; GDDR3	128	11	4.4	520	26
Mobility Radeon HD 5750	January 7, 2010	Madison PRO	Redwood (RV 830)	40	PCIe ×16 2.1	550	800	400:20:8	4.4	11	1024	51.2	GDDR5	128	11	4.4	440	25
Mobility Radeon HD 5770	January 7, 2010	Madison XT	Redwood (RV 830)	40	PCIe ×16 2.0/2.1	650	800	400:20:8	5.2	13	1024	51.2	GDDR5	128	11	4.4	520	30
Mobility Radeon HD 5830	January 7, 2010	Broadway LP	Juniper (RV 840)	40	PCIe ×16 2.1	500	800	800:40:16	8	20	1024	25.6	DDR3; GDDR3	128	11	4.4	800	24
Mobility Radeon HD 5850	January 7, 2010	Broadway PRO	Juniper (RV 840)	40	PCIe ×16 2.1	625; 500; 625	900; 1000	800:40:16	10; 8; 10	25; 20; 25	2048; 1024	28.8; 64; 64	DDR3; GDDR3	128	11	4.4	1000; 800; 1000az	31; 30; 39
Mobility Radeon HD 5870	January 7, 2010	Broadway XT	Juniper (RV 840)	40	PCIe ×16 2.1	700	1000	800:40:16	11.2	28	1024	64	GDDR5	128	11	4.4	1120	50
Model	Launch	Model Number	Code name	Fab (nm)	Bus interface	Core clock (MHz)	Memory clock (MHz)	Core config^{1}	Pixel (GP/s)	Texture (GT/s)	Size (MB)	Bandwidth (GB/s)	Bus type	Bus width (bit)	Direct3D	OpenGL	Processing power (GFLOPS)	TDP (Watts)
Model	Launch	Model Number	Code name	Fab (nm)	Bus interface	Core clock (MHz)	Memory clock (MHz)	Core config^{1}	Fillrate		Memory				API compliance (version)		Processing power (GFLOPS)	TDP (Watts)

^{1} Unified shaders : Texture mapping units : Render output units
^{2} The effective data transfer rate of GDDR5 is quadruple its nominal clock, instead of double as it is with other DDR memory.

=== Radeon HD 6000M series ===
Model	Launch	Architecture Fab	Core		Fillrate (Note: Texture fillrate is calculated as the number of Texture Mapping Units multiplied by the core clock speed.) (Note: Pixel fillrate is calculated as the number of Render Output Units multiplied by the core clock speed.)		Processing power (Note: Single Precision performance is calculated from the core clock speed based on a FMA operation.) (GFLOPS)	Memory				TDP (Watts)	Bus interface
Model	Launch	Architecture Fab	Config (Note: Unified Shaders : Texture Mapping Units : Render Output Units)	Clock (MHz)	Pixel (GP/s)	Texture (GT/s)	Processing power (GFLOPS)	Size (MiB)	Bus type & width	Clock (MHz)	Bandwidth (GB/s)	TDP (Watts)	Bus interface
Radeon HD 6330M (Robson LP)	November 2010	TeraScale 2; 40 nm	80:8:4	500	2.0	4.0	80	1024	DDR3; 64-bit	800	12.8	7	PCIe 2.1 x16
Radeon HD 6350M (Robson Pro)	November 2010	TeraScale 2; 40 nm	80:8:4	500	2.0	4.0	80	1024	DDR3; 64-bit	800; 900	12.8; 14.4	7	PCIe 2.1 x16
Radeon HD 6370M (Robson XT)	November 2010	TeraScale 2; 40 nm	80:8:4	750	3.0	6.0	120	1024	DDR3; 64-bit	900	14.4	11	PCIe 2.1 x16
Radeon HD 6430M (Seymour LP)	January 2011	TeraScale 2; 40 nm	160:8:4	480	1.92	3.84	153.6	1024	DDR3; 64-bit	800	12.8	Unknown	PCIe 2.1 x16
Radeon HD 6450M (Seymour Pro)	January 2011	TeraScale 2; 40 nm	160:8:4	600	2.4	4.8	192	1024	DDR3; 64-bit	800	12.8	Unknown	PCIe 2.1 x16
Radeon HD 6470M (Seymour XT)	January 2011	TeraScale 2; 40 nm	160:8:4	700; 750	2.8; 3.0	5.6; 6.0	224; 240	1024	DDR3; 64-bit	800; 800	12.8	Unknown	PCIe 2.1 x16
Radeon HD 6490M (Seymour XT)	January 2011	TeraScale 2; 40 nm	160:8:4	800	3.2	6.4	256	512	GDDR5; 64-bit	800	25.6	Unknown	PCIe 2.1 x16
Radeon HD 6530M (Capilano Pro)	November 2010	TeraScale 2; 40 nm	400:20:8	500	4.0	10.0	400	1024	DDR3; 128-bit	900	28.8	26	PCIe 2.1 x16
Radeon HD 6550M (Capilano Pro)	November 2010	TeraScale 2; 40 nm	400:20:8	600	4.8	12.0	480	1024	DDR3; 128-bit	900	28.8	26	PCIe 2.1 x16
Radeon HD 6570M (Capilano XT)	November 2010	TeraScale 2; 40 nm	400:20:8	650	5.2	13.0	520	1024	DDR3; 64-bit GDDR5; 128-bit	900	28.8 57.6	30	PCIe 2.1 x16
Radeon HD 6630M (Whistler LP)	January 2011	TeraScale 2; 40 nm	480:24:8	485	3.88	11.64	465.6	256 (Mac) 1024	GDDR5; 128-bit (Mac); DDR3; 128-bit	800	51.2 (Mac) 25.6	Unknown	PCIe 2.1 x16
Radeon HD 6650M (Whistler Pro)	January 2011	TeraScale 2; 40 nm	480:24:8	600	4.8	14.4	576	1024	DDR3; 128-bit	900	28.8	Unknown	PCIe 2.1 x16
Radeon HD 6730M (Whistler XT)	January 2011	TeraScale 2; 40 nm	480:24:8	725	5.8	17.4	696	1024	DDR3; 128-bit	800	25.6	Unknown	PCIe 2.1 x16
Radeon HD 6750M (Whistler Pro)	January 2011	TeraScale 2; 40 nm	480:24:8	600	4.8	14.4	576	256; 512; 1024	GDDR5; 128-bit	800; 900	51.2; 57.6	Unknown	PCIe 2.1 x16
Radeon HD 6770M (Whistler XT)	January 2011	TeraScale 2; 40 nm	480:24:8	725	5.8	17.4	696	1024	GDDR5; 128-bit	900	57.6	Unknown	PCIe 2.1 x16
Radeon HD 6830M (Granville Pro)	January 2011	TeraScale 2; 40 nm	800:40:16	575	9.2	23.0	920	2048	DDR3; 128-bit	800	25.6	39	PCIe 2.1 x16
Radeon HD 6850M (Granville XT)	January 2011	TeraScale 2; 40 nm	800:40:16	675	10.8	27.0	1080	2048	DDR3; 128-bit	800	25.6	50	PCIe 2.1 x16
Radeon HD 6850M (Granville Pro)	January 2011	TeraScale 2; 40 nm	800:40:16	575	9.2	23.0	920	1024	GDDR5; 128-bit	800	57.6	39	PCIe 2.1 x16
Radeon HD 6870M (Granville XT)	January 2011	TeraScale 2; 40 nm	800:40:16	675	10.8	27	1080	1024	GDDR5; 128-bit	1000	64	50	PCIe 2.1 x16
Radeon HD 6950M (Blackcomb Pro)	January 2011	TeraScale 2; 40 nm	960:48:32	580	18.56	27.84	1113.6	2048	GDDR5; 256-bit	900	115.2	50	PCIe 2.1 x16
Radeon HD 6970M (Blackcomb XT)	January 2011	TeraScale 2; 40 nm	960:48:32	680	21.76	32.64	1305.6	2048	GDDR5; 256-bit	900	115.2	75	PCIe 2.1 x16
Radeon HD 6990M (Blackcomb XTX)	July 2011	TeraScale 2; 40 nm	1120:56:32	715	22.88	40.04	1601.6	2048	GDDR5; 256-bit	900	115.2	75	PCIe 2.1 x16

==== IGP (HD 6000) ====
- All models feature the UNB/MC Bus interface
- All models lack double-precision FP
- All models feature Angle independent anisotropic filtering, UVD3, and Eyefinity capabilities, with up to three outputs.

Model	Released	Code name	Architecture	Fab (nm)	Core clock rate (MHz)	Config core (Note: Unified Shaders : Texture Mapping Units : Render Output Units : Compute units)	Fillrate		Shared memory			Processing power (GFLOPS)	API compliance (version)				Combined TDP (Note: TDP specified for AMD reference designs, includes CPU power consumption. Actual TDP of retail products may vary.)		APU
Model	Released	Code name	Architecture	Fab (nm)	Core clock rate (MHz)	Config core	Pixel (GP/s)	Texture (GT/s)	Bandwidth (GB/s)	Bus type	Bus width (bit)	Processing power (GFLOPS)	Direct3D	OpenGL	OpenCL	Vulkan	Idle (W)	Max. (W)	APU
Radeon HD 6250	November 9, 2010	Wrestler	TeraScale 2	40	280–400	80:8:4:2	1.12–1.6	2.24–3.2	8.525	DDR3-1066	64	44.8–64	11.3 (11_0)	4.5	1.2	—N/a	Unknown	9	C-30, C-50, Z-60
Radeon HD 6290	January 7, 2011	Ontario	TeraScale 2	40	276–400	80:8:4:2	1.12–1.6	2.24–3.2	8.525	DDR3-1066	64	44.8–64	11.3 (11_0)	4.5	1.2	—N/a	Unknown	9	C-60
Radeon HD 6310	November 9, 2010	Wrestler	TeraScale 2	40	492	80:8:4:2	2.0	4.0	8.525	DDR3-1066	64	80	11.3 (11_0)	4.5	1.2	—N/a	Unknown	18	E-240, E-300, E-350
Radeon HD 6320	August 15, 2011	Wrestler	TeraScale 2	40	508–600	80:8:4:2	2.032–2.4	4.064–4.8	10.6	DDR3-1333	64	82–97	11.3 (11_0)	4.5	1.2	—N/a	Unknown	18	E-450

==== IGP (HD 6000G) ====
- All models support Direct3D 11, OpenGL 4.4 and OpenCL 1.2
- All models feature the UNB/MC Bus interface
- All models lack double-precision FP
- All models feature angle independent anisotropic filtering, UVD3 and Eyefinity capabilities, with up to three outputs.
- All models feature VLIW5

Model	Released	Code name	Fab (nm)	Core clock (MHz)	Core config^{1}	Fillrate		Shared Memory			Processing power (GFLOPS)	Max. combined TDP^{2} (Watts)	APU
Model	Released	Code name	Fab (nm)	Core clock (MHz)	Core config^{1}	Pixel (GP/s)	Texture (GT/s)	Bandwidth (GB/s)	Bus type	Bus width (bit)	Processing power (GFLOPS)	Max. combined TDP^{2} (Watts)	APU
Radeon HD 6380G	June 14, 2011	WinterPark	32	400	160:8:4:2	1.6	3.2	17.06	DDR3-1333	128	128	35	E2-3000M
Radeon HD 6480G	June 14, 2011	BeaverCreek	32	444	240:12:4:3	1.77	3.55	17.06	DDR3-1333	128	213.1	35 - 45	A4-3300M A4-3310MX
Radeon HD 6520G	June 14, 2011	BeaverCreek	32	400	320:16:8:4	3.2	6.4	17.06	DDR3-1333	128	256	35 - 45	A6-3400M A6-3410MX A6-3420M
Radeon HD 6620G	June 14, 2011	BeaverCreek	32	444	400:20:8:5	3.55	8.88	25.6	DDR3-1600	128	355.2	35 - 45	A8-3500M A8-3510MX A8-3530MX

^{1} Unified shaders : Texture mapping units : Render output units : Compute units
^{2} TDP specified for AMD reference designs, includes CPU power consumption. Actual TDP of retail products may vary.

=== Radeon HD 7000M series ===
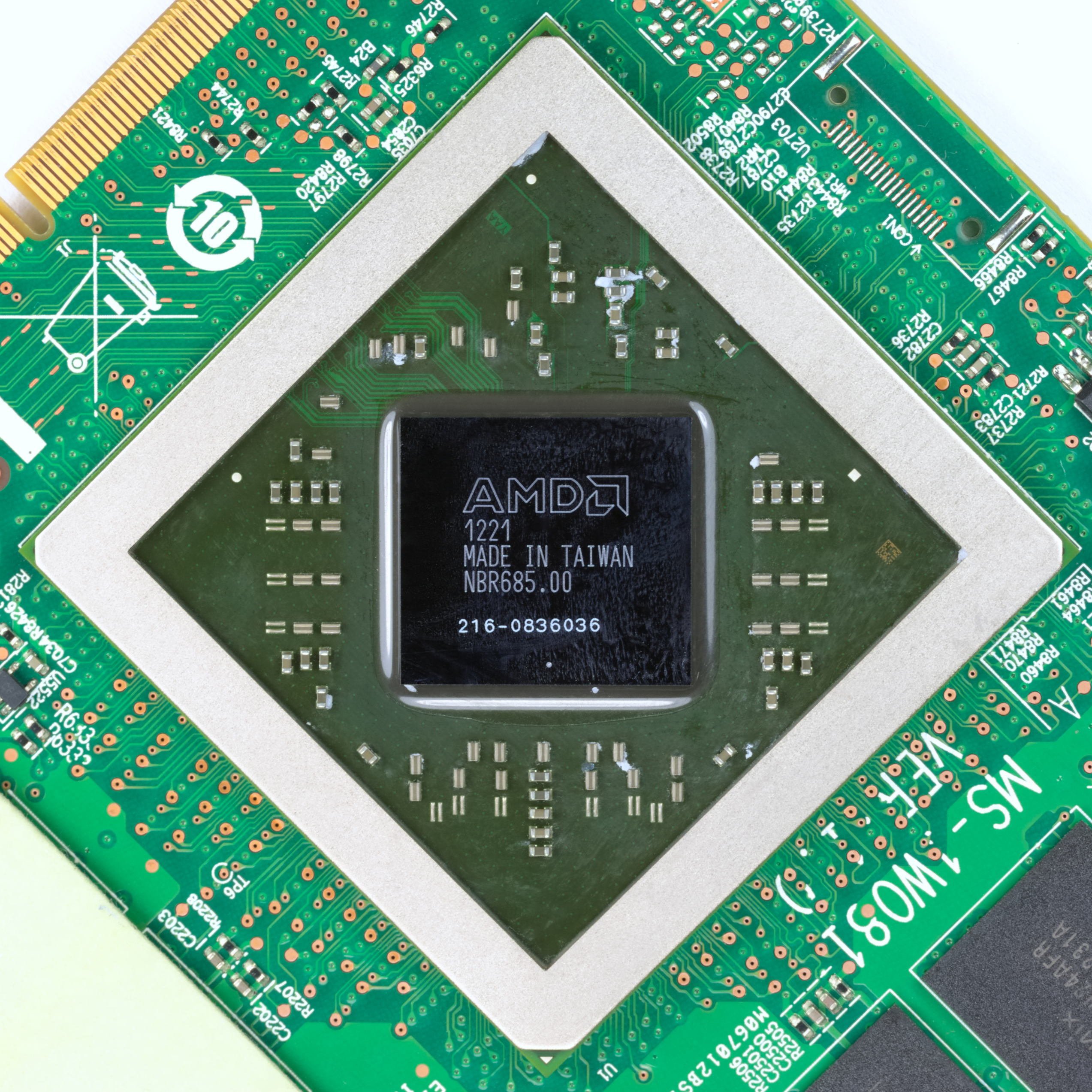
A Radeon HD 7970M GPU on a Mobile PCI Express Module

Model (Codename)	Launch	Architecture (Fab)	Core		Fillrate		Processing power (GFLOPS)	Memory				Bus interface	TDP (W)
Model (Codename)	Launch	Architecture (Fab)	Config (Note: Unified Shaders : Texture Mapping Units : Render Output Units)	Clock (MHz)	Texture (GT/s)	Pixel (GP/s)	Processing power (GFLOPS)	Size (GiB)	Bus type & width (bit) (Note: The effective data transfer rate of GDDR5 is quadruple its nominal clock, instead of double as it is with other DDR memory.)	Memory (MHz)	Bandwidth (GB/s)	Bus interface	TDP (W)
Radeon HD 7430M (Seymour Pro)	January 2012	TeraScale 2 (Note: Lacks hardware video encoder) (40 nm)	160:8:4:2	600	4.8	2.4	192	1	DDR3; 64-bit	900	14.4	PCIe 2.1 ×16	7
Radeon HD 7450M (Seymour Pro)	January 2012	TeraScale 2 (40 nm)	160:8:4:2	700; 700	5.6	2.8	224	1	DDR3; GDDR5; 64-bit	900; 800	14.4; 25.6	PCIe 2.1 ×16	7
Radeon HD 7470M (Seymour XT)	January 2012	TeraScale 2 (40 nm)	160:8:4:2	750; 800	6; 6.4	3.0; 3.2	240; 256	1	DDR3; GDDR5; 64-bit	900; 800	14.4; 25.6	PCIe 2.1 ×16	7~9
Radeon HD 7490M (Seymour XTX)	January 2012	TeraScale 2 (40 nm)	160:8:4:2	800	6.4	3.2	256	1	GDDR5; 64-bit	950	30.4	PCIe 2.1 ×16	9
Radeon HD 7510M (Thames LE)	January 2012	TeraScale 2 (40 nm)	400:20:8:5	450	9.0	3.6	360	1	DDR3; 64-bit	800	12.8	PCIe 2.1 ×16	11
Radeon HD 7530M (Thames LP)	January 2012	TeraScale 2 (40 nm)	400:24:8:5	450	9.0	3.6	360	1	DDR3; 64-bit	900	14.4	PCIe 2.1 ×16	11
Radeon HD 7550M (Thames Pro)	January 2012	TeraScale 2 (40 nm)	400:20:8:5	450; 550	9.0; 11.0	3.6; 4.4	360; 440	1	DDR3; GDDR5; 64-bit	900; 800	14.4; 25.6	PCIe 2.1 ×16	13
Radeon HD 7570M (Thames Pro)	January 2012	TeraScale 2 (40 nm)	400:20:8:5	450; 650	9.0; 13.0	3.6; 5.2	360; 520	1	DDR3; GDDR5; 64-bit	900; 800	14.4; 25.6	PCIe 2.1 ×16	13~15
Radeon HD 7590M (Thames XT)	January 2012	TeraScale 2 (40 nm)	480:24:8:6	600	14.4	4.8	576	1	GDDR5; 64-bit	800	25.6	PCIe 2.1 ×16	18
Radeon HD 7610M (Thames LE)	January 2012	TeraScale 2 (40 nm)	400:20:8:5	450	9.0	3.6	360	1	DDR3; 128-bit	800	25.6	PCIe 2.1 ×16	20
Radeon HD 7630M (Thames LP)	January 2012	TeraScale 2 (40 nm)	480:24:8:6	450	10.8	3.6	432	1	DDR3; 128-bit	800	25.6	PCIe 2.1 ×16	20~25
Radeon HD 7650M (Thames Pro)	January 2012	TeraScale 2 (40 nm)	480:24:8:6	450; 550	10.8; 13.2	3.6; 4.4	432; 528	1	DDR3; 128-bit	800; 800	25.6	PCIe 2.1 ×16	20~25
Radeon HD 7670M (Thames Pro)	January 2012	TeraScale 2 (40 nm)	480:24:8:6	600	14.4	4.8	576	1	DDR3; GDDR5; 128-bit	900	28.8; 57.6	PCIe 2.1 ×16	20~25
Radeon HD 7690M (Thames XT)	January 2012	TeraScale 2 (40 nm)	480:24:8:6	725; 600	17.4; 14.4	5.8; 4.8	696; 576	1; 2	DDR3; GDDR5; 128-bit	900; 900	28.8; 57.6	PCIe 2.1 ×16	20~25
Radeon HD 7690M XT (Thames XTX)	January 2012	TeraScale 2 (40 nm)	480:24:8:6	725	17.4	5.8	696	1; 2	GDDR5; 128-bit	900	57.6	PCIe 2.1 ×16	25
Radeon HD 7730M (Chelsea LP)	April 2012	GCN 1^{st} gen (28 nm)	512:32:16:8	575; 675	18.4; 21.6	9.2; 10.8	588.8; 691.2	2	GDDR3; 128-bit	900; 900	28.8	PCIe 2.1 ×16	25~28
Radeon HD 7750M (Chelsea Pro)	April 2012	GCN 1^{st} gen (28 nm)	512:32:16:8	575	18.4	9.2	588.8	1; 2	GDDR5; 128-bit	1000	64	PCIe 2.1 ×16	28
Radeon HD 7770M (Chelsea XT)	April 2012	GCN 1^{st} gen (28 nm)	512:32:16:8	675	21.6	10.8	691.2	1; 2	GDDR5; 128-bit	1000	64	PCIe 2.1 ×16	32
Radeon HD 7850M (Heathrow Pro)	April 2012	GCN 1^{st} gen (28 nm)	640:40:16:10	675	27	10.8	864	2	GDDR5; 128-bit	1000	64	PCIe 3.0 ×16	40
Radeon HD 7870M (Heathrow XT)	April 2012	GCN 1^{st} gen (28 nm)	640:40:16:10	800	32	12.8	1024	2	GDDR5; 128-bit	1000	64	PCIe 3.0 ×16	40–45
Radeon HD 7970M (Wimbledon XT)	April 2012	GCN 1^{st} gen (28 nm)	1280:80:32:20	850	68	27.2	2176	2; 4	GDDR5; 256-bit	1200	153.6	PCIe 3.0 ×16	75

==== IGP (HD 7000G) ====
Model (Codename)	Launch	Architecture (Fab)	Core config (Note: Unified Shaders : Texture Mapping Units : Render Output Units)	Clock rate (MHz)		Fillrate		Processing power (GFLOPS)	Shared memory		
Model (Codename)	Launch	Architecture (Fab)	Core config	Core (MHz)	Boost (MHz)	Pixel (GP/s)	Texture (GT/s)	Processing power (GFLOPS)	Bus type & width (bit)	Clock	Bandwidth (GB/s)
Radeon HD 7400G (Scrapper)	September 2012	TeraScale 3 (Note: Lacks hardware video encoder) (32 nm)	192:12:4	327	424	1.31	3.92	125.57	DDR3; 128-bit	1333 to 2133	21.33–34.13
Radeon HD 7420G (Scrapper)	June 2012	TeraScale 3 (32 nm)	128:8:4	480	655	1.92	3.84	122.88	DDR3; 128-bit	1333 to 2133	21.33–34.13
Radeon HD 7500G (Scrapper)	May 2012	TeraScale 3 (32 nm)	256:16:8	327	424	2.62	5.23	167.42	DDR3; 128-bit	1333 to 2133	21.33–34.13
Radeon HD 7520G (Scrapper)	June 2012	TeraScale 3 (32 nm)	192:12:4	496	685	1.98	5.95	190.46	DDR3; 128-bit	1333 to 2133	21.33–34.13
Radeon HD 7600G (Devastator)	September 2012	TeraScale 3 (32 nm)	384:24:8	320	424	2.56	7.68	245.76	DDR3; 128-bit	1333 to 2133	21.33–34.13
Radeon HD 7620G (Devastator)	May 2012	TeraScale 3 (32 nm)	384:24:8	360	497	2.88	8.64	276.48	DDR3; 128-bit	1333 to 2133	21.33–34.13
Radeon HD 7640G (Devastator)	May 2012	TeraScale 3 (32 nm)	256:16:8	496	685	3.97	7.94	253.95	DDR3; 128-bit	1333 to 2133	21.33–34.13
Radeon HD 7660G (Devastator)	May 2012	TeraScale 3 (32 nm)	384:24:8	496	685	3.97	11.9	380.93	DDR3; 128-bit	1333 to 2133	21.33–34.13

=== Radeon HD 8000M series ===
Model (Codename)	Launch	Architecture (Fab)	Core		Fillrate (Note: Boost values (if available) are stated below the base value in italic.) (Note: Texture fillrate is calculated as the number of Texture Mapping Units multiplied by the base (or boost) core clock speed.) (Note: Pixel fillrate is calculated as the number of Render Output Units multiplied by the base (or boost) core clock speed.)		Processing power (Note: Precision performance is calculated from the base (or boost) core clock speed based on a FMA operation.) (GFLOPS)	Memory (Note: The effective data transfer rate of GDDR5 is quadruple its nominal clock, instead of double as it is with other DDR memory.)				TDP (W)
Model (Codename)	Launch	Architecture (Fab)	Config (Note: Unified Shaders : Texture Mapping Units : Render Output Units)	Clock (MHz)	Texture (GT/s)	Pixel (GP/s)	Processing power (GFLOPS)	Size (GiB)	Bus type & width (bit)	Clock (MHz)	Band- width (GB/s)	TDP (W)
Radeon HD 8550M / 8630M (Sun LE)	8 January 2013	GCN 1^{st} gen (28 nm)	384:24:8	650; 700	15.6; 16.8	5.2; 5.6	537.6	1	DDR3; 64	900	14.4	Unknown
Radeon HD 8570M / 8650M (Sun Pro)	8 January 2013	GCN 1^{st} gen (28 nm)	384:24:8	650; 700	15.6; 16.8	5.2; 5.6	537.6	1	GDDR5; 64	1125	36	Unknown
Radeon HD 8670M (Mars XT)	8 January 2013	GCN 1^{st} gen (28 nm)	384:24:8	775; 825	18.6; 19.8	6.2; 6.6	633.6	1	DDR3; 64	900	14.4	Unknown
Radeon HD 8690M (Sun XT)	8 January 2013	GCN 1^{st} gen (28 nm)	384:24:8	775; 825	18.6; 19.8	6.2; 6.6	633.6	1	GDDR5; 64	1125	36	Unknown
Radeon HD 8730M (Mars LE)	8 January 2013	GCN 1^{st} gen (28 nm)	384:24:8	650; 700	15.6; 16.8	5.2; 5.6	537.6	2	DDR3; 128	1000	32	Unknown
Radeon HD 8750M (Mars Pro)	8 January 2013	GCN 1^{st} gen (28 nm)	384:24:8	620–775; 670–825	14.88; 19.8	4.96; 6.6	514.56; 633.6	2	DDR3; GDDR5; 128	1000	32; 64	Unknown
Radeon HD 8770M (Mars XT)	8 January 2013	GCN 1^{st} gen (28 nm)	384:24:8	775; 825	18.6; 19.8	6.2; 6.6	633.6	2	GDDR5; 128	1125	72	Unknown
Radeon HD 8790M (Mars XTX)	8 January 2013	GCN 1^{st} gen (28 nm)	384:24:8	850; 900	20.4; 21.6	6.8; 7.2	691.2	2	GDDR5; 128	1125	72	Unknown
Radeon HD 8830M (Venus LE)	8 January 2013	GCN 1^{st} gen (28 nm)	640:40:16	575; 625	23; 25	9.2; 10	800	2	DDR3; 128	1000	32	Unknown
Radeon HD 8850M (Venus Pro)	8 January 2013	GCN 1^{st} gen (28 nm)	640:40:16	575–725; 625–775	23; 31	9.2; 12.4	800; 992	2	DDR3; GDDR5; 128	1000; 1125	32; 72	Unknown
Radeon HD 8870M (Venus XT)	8 January 2013	GCN 1^{st} gen (28 nm)	640:40:16	725; 775	29; 31	11.6; 12.4	992	2	DDR3; GDDR5; 128	1000; 1125	32; 72	Unknown
Radeon HD 8970M (Neptune XT)	8 January 2013	GCN 1^{st} gen (28 nm)	1280:80:32	850; 900	68; 72	27.2; 28.8	2304	2; 4	GDDR5; 256	1200	153.6	100

=== Radeon M200 series ===
Model (Codename)	Launch	Architecture (Fab)	Core		Fillrate (Note: Boost values (if available) are stated below the base value in italic.) (Note: Texture fillrate is calculated as the number of Texture Mapping Units multiplied by the base (or boost) core clock speed.) (Note: Pixel fillrate is calculated as the number of Render Output Units multiplied by the base (or boost) core clock speed.)		Processing power (Note: Precision performance is calculated from the base (or boost) core clock speed based on a FMA operation.) (GFLOPS)	Memory				TDP
Model (Codename)	Launch	Architecture (Fab)	Config (Note: Unified Shaders : Texture Mapping Units : Render Output Units)	Clock (MHz)	Texture (GT/s)	Pixel (GP/s)	Processing power (GFLOPS)	Size (GiB)	Bus type & width	Clock (MT/s)	Band- width (GB/s)	TDP
Radeon R5 M230 (Jet Pro)	January 2014	GCN 1^{st} gen (28 nm)	320:20:8:5	780; 855	3.4	17.1	547	2; 4	DDR3; 64-bit	2000	16	Unknown
Radeon R5 M255 (Topaz Pro)	October 2014	GCN 3^{rd} gen (28 nm)	320:20:8:5	925; 940	7.5	18.8	601	2; 4	DDR3; 64-bit	1800; 2000	16	Unknown
Radeon R7 M260 (Topaz XT)	June 2014	GCN 3^{rd} gen (28 nm)	384:24:8:6	620; 980	5.7; 7.8	17.2; 23.5	549.1; 752.6	2; 4	DDR3; 128-bit	1800; 2000	14.4; 16	Unknown
Radeon R7 M260X (Opal Pro)	December 2015	GCN 1^{st} gen (28 nm)	384:24:8:6	620; 715	5.7	17.2	549	2; 4	GDDR5; 128-bit	4000	64	Unknown
Radeon R7 M265 (Opal XT)	May 2014	GCN 1^{st} gen (28 nm)	384:24:8:6	725; 825	6.6	19.8	633.6	2; 4	DDR3; 64-bit	1800; 2000	14.4; 16	Unknown
Radeon R9 M265X (Venus Pro)	May 2014	GCN 1^{st} gen (28 nm)	640:40:16:10	575; 625	10	25	800	2; 4	GDDR5; 128-bit	4500	72	Unknown
Radeon R9 M270X (Venus XT)	May 2014	GCN 1^{st} gen (28 nm)	640:40:16:10	725; 775	12.4	31	992	2; 4	GDDR5; 128-bit	4500	72	Unknown
Radeon R9 M275X (Venus XTX)	May 2014	GCN 1^{st} gen (28 nm)	640:40:16:10	900; 925	14.8	37	1184	2; 4	GDDR5; 128-bit	4500	72	50 W
Radeon R9 M280X (Saturn XT)	February 2015	GCN 2^{nd} gen (28 nm)	896:56:16:14	1000; 1100	17.6	61.6	1792	2; 4	GDDR5; 128-bit	6000	96	~75 W
Radeon R9 M290X (Neptune XT)	May 2014	GCN 1^{st} gen (28 nm)	1280:80:32:20	850; 900	28.8	72	2176; 2304	4	GDDR5; 256-bit	4800	153.6	100 W
Radeon R9 M295X (Amethyst XT)	November 2014	GCN 3^{rd} gen (28 nm)	2048:128:32:32	750; 800	25.6	102.4	3276.8	4	GDDR5; 256-bit	5500	176	250 W

=== Radeon M300 series ===
Model (Codename)	Launch	Architecture (Fab)	Core		Fillrate (Note: Boost values (if available) are stated below the base value in italic.) (Note: Texture fillrate is calculated as the number of Texture Mapping Units multiplied by the base (or boost) core clock speed.) (Note: Pixel fillrate is calculated as the number of Render Output Units multiplied by the base (or boost) core clock speed.)		Processing power (Note: Precision performance is calculated from the base (or boost) core clock speed based on a FMA operation.) (GFLOPS)	Memory				TDP
Model (Codename)	Launch	Architecture (Fab)	Config (Note: Unified Shaders : Texture Mapping Units : Render Output Units)	Clock (MHz)	Texture (GT/s)	Pixel (GP/s)	Processing power (GFLOPS)	Size (GiB)	Bus type & width	Clock (MT/s)	Band- width (GB/s)	TDP
Radeon R5 M330 (Exo Pro)	2015	GCN 1^{st} gen (28 nm)	320:20:8	Unknown; 1030	8.2	20.6	659.2	2; 4	DDR3; 64-bit	1800; 2000	14.4; 16	18 W
Radeon R5 M335 (Exo Pro)	2015	GCN 1^{st} gen (28 nm)	320:20:8	Unknown; 1070	8.6	21.4	684.8	2; 4	DDR3; 64-bit	2200	17.6	Unknown
Radeon R7 M360 (Meso XT)	2015	GCN 1^{st} gen (28 nm)	384:24:8	Unknown; 1125	9	27	864	2; 4	DDR3; 64-bit	2000	16	Unknown
Radeon R9 M365X (Strato Pro)	2015	GCN 1^{st} gen (28 nm)	640:40:16	Unknown; 925	14.8	37	1184	4	GDDR5; 128-bit	4500	72	50 W
Radeon R9 M370X (Strato Pro)	May 2015	GCN 1^{st} gen (28 nm)	640:40:16	800	12.8	32	1024	2	GDDR5; 128-bit	4500	72	40–45 W
Radeon R9 M375 (Strato Pro)	2015	GCN 1^{st} gen (28 nm)	640:40:16	Unknown; 1015	16.2	40.6	1299.2	4	GDDR5; 128-bit	4400	35.2	Unknown
Radeon R9 M375X (Strato Pro)	2015	GCN 1^{st} gen (28 nm)	640:40:16	Unknown; 1015	16.2	40.6	1299.2	4	GDDR5; 128-bit	4500	72	Unknown
Radeon R9 M380 (Strato Pro)	2015	GCN 1^{st} gen (28 nm)	640:40:16	Unknown; 900	14.4	36	1152	4	GDDR5; 128-bit	6000	96	Unknown
Radeon R9 M385X (Strato)	2015	GCN 2^{nd} gen (28 nm)	896:56:16	Unknown; 1100	17.6	61.6	1971.2	4	GDDR5; 128-bit	6000	96	~75 W
Radeon R9 M390 (Pitcairn)	June 2015	GCN 1^{st} gen (28 nm)	1024:64:32	Unknown; 958	30.7	61.3	1962	2	GDDR5; 256-bit	5460	174.7	~100 W
Radeon R9 M390X (Amethyst XT)	2015	GCN 3^{rd} gen (28 nm)	2048:128:32	Unknown; 723	23.1	92.5	2961.4	4	GDDR5; 256-bit	5000	160	125 W
Radeon R9 M395 (Amethyst Pro)	2015	GCN 3^{rd} gen (28 nm)	1792:112:32	Unknown; 834	26.6	93.4	2989.0	2	GDDR5; 256-bit	5460	174.7	125 W
Radeon R9 M395X Amethyst XT)	2015	GCN 3^{rd} gen (28 nm)	2048:128:32	Unknown; 909	29.1	116.3	3723.3	4	GDDR5; 256-bit	5460	174.7	125 W

=== Radeon M400 series ===
Model (Codename)	Launch	Architecture & Fab	Core		Fillrate (Note: Boost values (if available) are stated below the base value in italic.) (Note: Texture fillrate is calculated as the number of Texture Mapping Units multiplied by the base (or boost) core clock speed.) (Note: Pixel fillrate is calculated as the number of Render Output Units multiplied by the base (or boost) core clock speed.)		Processing power (Note: Precision performance is calculated from the base (or boost) core clock speed based on a FMA operation.) (GFLOPS)	Memory				TDP
Model (Codename)	Launch	Architecture & Fab	Config (Note: Unified Shaders : Texture Mapping Units : Render Output Units)	Clock (MHz)	Texture (GT/s)	Pixel (GP/s)	Processing power (GFLOPS)	Bus type & width	Size (GiB)	Clock (MHz)	Band- width (GB/s)	TDP
Radeon R5 M420 (Jet Pro)	15 May 2016	GCN 1^{st} gen 28 nm	320:20:8	780; 855	15.6; 17.1	6.24; 6.84	499; 547	DDR3; 64-bit	2	1000	16.0	~20 W
Radeon R5 M430 (Exo Pro)	15 May 2016	GCN 1^{st} gen 28 nm	320:20:8	1030 ?	20.6	8.2	659.2; 659.2	DDR3; 64-bit	2	1000	14.4	18 W
Radeon R7 M435 (Jet Pro)	15 May 2016	GCN 1^{st} gen 28 nm	320:20:8	780; 855	15.6; 17.1	6.24; 6.84	499; 547	GDDR5; 64-bit	4	1000	32	~20 W
Radeon R7 M440 (Meso Pro)	15 May 2016	GCN 1^{st} gen 28 nm	320:20:8	1021 ?	20.4	8.17	653; 653	DDR3; 64-bit	4	1000	16	~20 W
Radeon R7 M445 (Meso Pro)	14 May 2016	GCN 1^{st} gen 28 nm	320:20:8	780; 920	15.6; 18.4	6.24; 7.36	499; 589	GDDR5; 64-bit	4	1000	32	~20 W
Radeon R7 M460 (Meso XT)	April 2016	GCN 1^{st} gen 28 nm	384:24:8	1100; 1125	26.4; 27.0	8.8; 9.00	844; 864	DDR3; 64-bit	2	900	14.4	Unknown
Radeon RX 460 (Baffin)	August 2016	GCN 4^{th} gen 14 nm	896:56:16	Unknown	Unknown	Unknown	Unknown	GDDR5; 128-bit	2	1750	112	35 W?
Radeon R7 M465 (Litho XT)	May 2016	GCN 1^{st} gen 28 nm	384:24:8	825; 960	19.8; 23.0	6.6; 7.68	634; 737	GDDR5; 128-bit	4	1150	32	Unknown
Radeon R7 M465X (Tropo XT)	May 2016	GCN 1^{st} gen 28 nm	512:32:16	900; 925	28.8; 29.6	14.4; 14.80	921; 947	GDDR5; 128-bit	4	1125	72	Unknown
Radeon R9 M470 (Strato Pro)	May 2016	GCN 2^{nd} gen 28 nm	768:48:16	900; 1000	43.2; 48.0	14.4; 16.00	1382; 1536	GDDR5; 128-bit	4	1500	96	~75 W
Radeon R9 M470X (Strato XT)	May 2016	GCN 2^{nd} gen 28 nm	896:56:16	1000; 1100	56.0; 61.6	16.00; 17.60	1792; 1971	GDDR5; 128-bit	4	1500	96	~75 W
Radeon RX 470 (Ellesmere Pro)	August 2016	GCN 4^{th} gen 14 nm	2048:128:32	Unknown	Unknown	Unknown	Unknown	GDDR5; 256-bit	4	1650	211	85 W?
Radeon RX 480M (Baffin)	TBA	GCN 4^{th} gen 14 nm	1024:xx:xx	Unknown	Unknown	Unknown	Unknown	GDDR5; 128-bit	Unknown	Unknown	Unknown	35 W
Radeon R9 M485X (Antigua XT)	May 2016	GCN 3^{rd} gen 28 nm	2048:128:32	723	92.5	23.14	2961	GDDR5; 256-bit	8	1250	160	~100 W

=== Radeon M500 series ===
Model (Codename)	Launch	Architecture (Fab)	Core		Fillrate (Note: Boost values (if available) are stated below the base value in italic.) (Note: Texture fillrate is calculated as the number of Texture Mapping Units multiplied by the base (or boost) core clock speed.) (Note: Pixel fillrate is calculated as the number of Render Output Units multiplied by the base (or boost) core clock speed.)		Processing power (Note: Precision performance is calculated from the base (or boost) core clock speed based on a FMA operation.) (GFLOPS)	Memory				TDP
Model (Codename)	Launch	Architecture (Fab)	Config (Note: Unified Shaders : Texture Mapping Units : Render Output Units)	Clock (MHz)	Texture (GT/s)	Pixel (GP/s)	Processing power (GFLOPS)	Bus type & width	Size (GiB)	Clock (MHz)	Band- width (GB/s)	TDP
Radeon 520 (Banks)	18 April 2017	GCN 1^{st} gen (28 nm)	320:20:8	1030	20.6	8.2	659	DDR3; 64-bit	2	1000	16.0	50 W
Radeon 520 (Banks)	18 April 2017	GCN 1^{st} gen (28 nm)	320:20:8	1030	20.6	8.2	659	GDDR5; 64-bit	2	1125	36	50 W
Radeon 530 (Weston)	18 April 2017	GCN 3^{rd} gen (28 nm)	384:24:8	730; 1024	24.6	8.2	786	DDR3; 64-bit	2	900	14.4	50 W
Radeon 530X Radeon 535 (Polaris 24 XT)	18 April 2017	GCN 3^{rd} gen (28 nm)	384:24:8	730; 1024	24.6	8.2	786	GDDR5; 64-bit	2	1125	36	50 W
Radeon RX 540 (Lexa Pro)	11 November 2017	GCN 4^{th} gen (14 nm)	512:32:16	1124; 1219	39	19.5	1248	GDDR5; 128-bit	2	1500	96	50 W
Radeon 540X (Polaris 23 XL)	11 April 2018	GCN 4^{th} gen (14 nm)	512:32:16	1124; 1219	39	19.5	1248	GDDR5; 128-bit	2	1500	96	50 W
Radeon RX 550 (Lexa Pro)	2 July 2017	GCN 4^{th} gen (14 nm)	640:40:16	1100; 1287	51.5	20.6	1647	GDDR5; 128-bit	2	1500	96	50 W
Radeon 550X (Polaris 23 XT)	11 April 2018	GCN 4^{th} gen (14 nm)	640:40:16	1100; 1287	51.5	20.6	1647	GDDR5; 128-bit	2	1500	96	50 W
Radeon RX 560 (Baffin XT)	5 January 2017	GCN 4^{th} gen (14 nm)	896:56:16	784; 1032	57.8	16.5	1849	GDDR5; 128-bit	4	1710	109.4	55 W
Radeon RX 560 (Baffin XT)	5 January 2017	GCN 4^{th} gen (14 nm)	896:56:16	1000; 1053	59	16.9	1887	GDDR5; 128-bit	4	1500	96	55 W
Radeon RX 560 (Baffin XT)	5 January 2017	GCN 4^{th} gen (14 nm)	1024:64:16	1090; 1202	77	19.2	2462	GDDR5; 128-bit	4	1500	96	65 W
Radeon RX 560X (Polaris 31 XL)	9 January 2019	GCN 4^{th} gen (14 nm)	896:56:16	1223	68.5	19.6	2192	GDDR5; 128-bit	4	1750	112	65 W
Radeon RX 570 (Ellesmere Pro)	10 December 2017	GCN 4^{th} gen (14 nm)	2048:128:32	926; 1206	154.4	38.6	4940	GDDR5; 256-bit	8	1650	211	85 W
Radeon RX 580 (Polaris 20 XT)	18 April 2017	GCN 4^{th} gen (14 nm)	2304:144:32	1000; 1077	155.1	34.5	4963	GDDR5; 256-bit	8	2000	256	100 W
Radeon RX 580X (Polaris 20 XT)	11 April 2018	GCN 4^{th} gen (14 nm)	2304:144:32	1000; 1077	155.1	34.5	4963	GDDR5; 256-bit	8	2000	256	100 W

=== Radeon 600 series ===
Model (Code name)	Release date & price	Architecture & fab	Transistors & die size	Core		Fillrate (Note: Boost values (if available) are stated below the base value in italic.) (Note: Texture fillrate is calculated as the number of Texture Mapping Units multiplied by the base (or boost) core clock speed.) (Note: Pixel fillrate is calculated as the number of Render Output Units multiplied by the base (or boost) core clock speed.)		Processing power (Note: Precision performance is calculated from the base (or boost) core clock speed based on a FMA operation.) (GFLOPS)		Memory				TBP	Bus interface
Model (Code name)	Release date & price	Architecture & fab	Transistors & die size	Config (Note: Unified shaders : Texture mapping units : Render output units and Compute units (CU))	Clock (MHz)	Texture (GT/s)	Pixel (GP/s)	Single	Double	Size (GB)	Bandwidth (GB/s)	Bus type & width	Clock (MT/s)	TBP	Bus interface
Radeon 610 (Banks)	Aug 13, 2019; OEM	GCN 1 TSMC 28 nm	6.9×10^{8} 56 mm^{2}	320:20:4; 5 CU	1030	20.60	8.24	659.2	41.20	2; 4	36.0	GDDR5; 64-bit	4500	50 W	PCIe 3.0 ×8
Radeon 620 (Polaris 24)	Aug 13, 2019; OEM	GCN 3 TSMC 28 nm	1.55×10^{9} 125 mm^{2}	320:20:8; 6 CU	730; 1024	17.52; 24.58	5.84; 8.19	560.6; 786.4	35.04; 49.15	2; 4	14.4	DDR3; 64-bit	1800	50 W	PCIe 3.0 ×8
Radeon 620 (Polaris 24)	Aug 13, 2019; OEM	GCN 3 TSMC 28 nm	1.55×10^{9} 125 mm^{2}	384:24:8; 6 CU	730; 1024	17.52; 24.58	5.84; 8.19	560.6; 786.4	35.04; 49.15	2; 4	36.0	GDDR5; 64-bit	4500	50 W	PCIe 3.0 ×8
Radeon 625 (Polaris 24)	Aug 13, 2019; OEM	GCN 3 TSMC 28 nm	1.55×10^{9} 125 mm^{2}	384:24:8; 6 CU	730; 1024	17.52; 24.58	5.84; 8.19	560.6; 786.4	35.04; 49.15	2; 4	36.0	GDDR5; 64-bit	4500	50 W	PCIe 3.0 ×8
Radeon 630 (Polaris 23)	Aug 13, 2019; OEM	GCN 4 GloFo 14 nm (Note: GlobalFoundries' 14 nm 14LPP FinFET process is second-sourced from Samsung Electronics.)	2.2×10^{9} 103 mm^{2}	512:32:8; 8 CU	1082; 1219	34.62; 38.98	8.65; 9.75	1,108; 1,248	69.24; 78.01	2; 4	48.0	GDDR5; 64-bit	6000	50 W	PCIe 3.0 ×8
Radeon RX 640 (Polaris 23)	Aug 13, 2019; OEM	GCN 4 GloFo 14 nm	2.2×10^{9} 103 mm^{2}	512:40:16; 8 CU	1082; 1287	43.28; 51.48	17.31; 20.59	1,385; 1,647	86.56; 102.9	2; 4	56.0	GDDR5; 64-bit	7000	50 W	PCIe 3.0 ×8
Radeon RX 640 (Polaris 23)	Aug 13, 2019; OEM	GCN 4 GloFo 14 nm	2.2×10^{9} 103 mm^{2}	640:40:16; 10 CU	1082; 1287	43.28; 51.48	17.31; 20.59	1,385; 1,647	86.56; 102.9	2; 4	56.0	GDDR5; 64-bit	7000	50 W	PCIe 3.0 ×8

=== Radeon RX 5000M series ===
Model (Code name)	Release date	Architecture & fab	Transistors & die size	Core		Fillrate (Note: Boost values (if available) are stated below the base value in italic.) (Note: Texture fillrate is calculated as the number of Texture Mapping Units multiplied by the base (or boost) core clock speed.) (Note: Pixel fillrate is calculated as the number of Render Output Units multiplied by the base (or boost) core clock speed.)		Processing power (Note: Precision performance is calculated from the base (or boost) core clock speed based on a FMA operation.) (GFLOPS)			Memory				TDP	Bus interface
Model (Code name)	Release date	Architecture & fab	Transistors & die size	Config (Note: Unified shaders : Texture mapping units : Render output units and Compute units (CU))	Clock (MHz)	Texture (GT/s)	Pixel (GP/s)	Half	Single	Double	Size (GB)	Bandwidth (GB/s)	Bus type & width	Clock (MT/s)	TDP	Bus interface
Radeon RX 5300M (Navi 14)	Nov 13, 2019	RDNA; TSMC N7	6.4×10^{9} 158 mm^{2}	1408:88:32; 22 CU	1000; 1445	88.0; 127.2	32.0; 46.2	5,632; 8,138	2,816; 4,069	176.0; 254.3	3	168	GDDR6; 96-bit	14000	65 W	PCIe 4.0 ×8
Radeon RX 5500M (Navi 14)	Oct 7, 2019	RDNA; TSMC N7	6.4×10^{9} 158 mm^{2}	1408:88:32; 22 CU	1375; 1645	121.0; 144.8	44.0; 52.6	7,744; 9,265	3,872; 4,632	242.0; 289.5	4	224	GDDR6; 128-bit	14000	85 W	PCIe 4.0 ×8
Radeon RX 5600M (Navi 10)	Jul 7, 2020	RDNA; TSMC N7	10.3×10^{9} 251 mm^{2}	2304:144:64; 36 CU	1035; 1265	149.0; 182.2	66.2; 80.9	9,539; 11,658	4,769; 5,829	298.0; 364.3	6	288	GDDR6; 192-bit	12000	85 W	PCIe 4.0 ×16
Radeon RX 5700M (Navi 10)	Mar 1, 2020	RDNA; TSMC N7	10.3×10^{9} 251 mm^{2}	2304:144:64; 36 CU	1465; 1720	210.9; 247.7	93.7; 110.1	13,501; 15,852	6,751; 7,926	421.9; 495.4	8	384	GDDR6; 256-bit	12000	120 W	PCIe 4.0 ×16

=== Radeon RX 6000M series ===
Model (Code name)	Release date	Architecture & fab	Transistors & die size	Core		Fillrate (Note: Boost values (if available) are stated below the base value in italic.) (Note: Texture fillrate is calculated as the number of Texture Mapping Units multiplied by the base (or boost) core clock speed.) (Note: Pixel fillrate is calculated as the number of Render Output Units multiplied by the base (or boost) core clock speed.)		Processing power (Note: Precision performance is calculated from the base (or boost) core clock speed based on a FMA operation.) (GFLOPS)			Infinity Cache	Memory				HW Decoder			HW Encoder			TDP	Bus interface
Model (Code name)	Release date	Architecture & fab	Transistors & die size	Config (Note: Unified shaders : Texture mapping units : Render output units : Ray accelerators and Compute units CU)	Clock (MHz)	Texture (GT/s)	Pixel (GP/s)	Half	Single	Double	Infinity Cache	Size	Bandwidth (GB/s)	Bus type & width	Clock (MT/s)	AV1	H265	4K H264	AV1	H265	4K H264	TDP	Bus interface
Radeon RX 6300M (Navi 24) (Note: Lacks hardware video encoder.)	Jan 4, 2022	RDNA 2 TSMC N6	5.4×10^{9} 107 mm^{2}	768:64:32:12; 12 CU	1512	97.76	48.38	6,270	3,130	195.6	8 MB	2 GB	64	GDDR6; 32-bit	16000	No	Yes	Yes	No	No	No	25 W	PCIe 4.0 ×4
Radeon RX 6450M (Navi 24)	Jan 4, 2023	RDNA 2 TSMC N6	5.4×10^{9} 107 mm^{2}	768:64:32:12; 12 CU	2220	118.10	71.04	7,600	3,780	236.3	16 MB	4 GB	128	GDDR6; 64-bit	16000	No	Yes	Yes	No	No	No	50 W	PCIe 4.0 ×4
Radeon RX 6550S (Navi 24)	Jan 4, 2023	RDNA 2 TSMC N6	5.4×10^{9} 107 mm^{2}	1024:64:32:16; 16 CU	2170	154.20	69.44	9,900	4,900	306.3	16 MB	4 GB	128	GDDR6; 64-bit	16000	No	Yes	Yes	No	No	No	50 W	PCIe 4.0 ×4
Radeon RX 6500M (Navi 24)	Jan 4, 2022	RDNA 2 TSMC N6	5.4×10^{9} 107 mm^{2}	1024:64:32:16; 16 CU	2191	155.7	70.11	9,970	4,980	311.2	16 MB	4 GB	128	GDDR6; 64-bit	16000	No	Yes	Yes	No	No	No	50 W	PCIe 4.0 ×4
Radeon RX 6550M (Navi 24)	Jan 4, 2023	RDNA 2 TSMC N6	5.4×10^{9} 107 mm^{2}	1024:64:32:16; 16 CU	2560	182.10	81.92	11,600	5,800	362.5	16 MB	4 GB	144	GDDR6; 64-bit	18000	No	Yes	Yes	No	No	No	80 W	PCIe 4.0 ×4
Radeon RX 6600S (Navi 23)	Jan 4, 2022	RDNA 2 TSMC N7	11.06×10^{9} 237 mm^{2}	1792:128:64:28; 28 CU	1881	244.2	120.3	15,630	7,810	448.1	32 MB	4 GB	224	GDDR6; 128-bit	14000	Yes	Yes	Yes	No	Yes	Yes	80 W	PCIe 4.0 ×8
Radeon RX 6700S (Navi 23)	Jan 4, 2022	RDNA 2 TSMC N7	11.06×10^{9} 237 mm^{2}	1792:128:64:28; 28 CU	1890	247.5	120.9	15,840	7,920	495.0	32 MB	8 GB	224	GDDR6; 128-bit	14000	Yes	Yes	Yes	No	Yes	Yes	80 W	PCIe 4.0 ×8
Radeon RX 6600M (Navi 23)	May 31, 2021	RDNA 2 TSMC N7	11.06×10^{9} 237 mm^{2}	1792:128:64:28; 28 CU	2177	274.2	139.3	17,550	7,800	487.5	32 MB	8 GB	224	GDDR6; 128-bit	14000	Yes	Yes	Yes	No	Yes	Yes	100 W	PCIe 4.0 ×8
Radeon RX 6650M (Navi 23)	Jan 4, 2022	RDNA 2 TSMC N7	11.06×10^{9} 237 mm^{2}	1792:128:64:28; 28 CU	2222	276.6	139.3	17,700	8,850	553.1	32 MB	8 GB	256	GDDR6; 128-bit	16000	Yes	Yes	Yes	No	Yes	Yes	120 W	PCIe 4.0 ×8
Radeon RX 6800S (Navi 23)	Jan 4, 2022	RDNA 2 TSMC N7	11.06×10^{9} 237 mm^{2}	2048:128:64:32; 32 CU	1975	288.0	134.4	18,430	9,220	576.5	32 MB	8 GB	256	GDDR6; 128-bit	16000	Yes	Yes	Yes	No	Yes	Yes	100 W	PCIe 4.0 ×8
Radeon RX 6650M XT (Navi 23)	Jan 4, 2022	RDNA 2 TSMC N7	11.06×10^{9} 237 mm^{2}	2048:128:64:32; 32 CU	2162	311.5	142.2	19,940	9,970	623.1	32 MB	8 GB	256	GDDR6; 128-bit	16000	Yes	Yes	Yes	No	Yes	Yes	120 W	PCIe 4.0 ×8
Radeon RX 6700M (Navi 22)	May 31, 2021	RDNA 2 TSMC N7	17.2×10^{9} 335 mm^{2}	2304:144:64:36; 36 CU	2300	331.4	147.2	21,209	10,605	662.1	80 MB	10 GB	320	GDDR6; 160-bit	16000	Yes	Yes	Yes	No	Yes	Yes	135 W	PCIe 4.0 ×16
Radeon RX 6800M (Navi 22)	May 31, 2021	RDNA 2 TSMC N7	17.2×10^{9} 335 mm^{2}	2560:160:64:40; 40 CU	2300	368.0	147.2	23,550	11,780	736.2	96 MB	12 GB	384	GDDR6; 192-bit	16000	Yes	Yes	Yes	No	Yes	Yes	145+ W	PCIe 4.0 ×16
Radeon RX 6850M XT (Navi 22)	Jan 4, 2022	RDNA 2 TSMC N7	17.2×10^{9} 335 mm^{2}	2560:160:64:40; 40 CU	2580	415.6	157.6	26,430	13,209	825.6	96 MB	12 GB	432	GDDR6; 192-bit	18000	Yes	Yes	Yes	No	Yes	Yes	165 W	PCIe 4.0 ×16

=== Radeon RX 7000M series ===
Model (Code name)	Release date	Architecture & fab	Chiplets	Transistors & die size	Core		Fillrate (Note: Boost values (if available) are stated below the base value in italic.) (Note: Texture fillrate is calculated as the number of Texture Mapping Units multiplied by the base (or boost) core clock speed.) (Note: Pixel fillrate is calculated as the number of Render Output Units multiplied by the base (or boost) core clock speed.)		Processing power (Note: Precision performance is calculated from the base (or boost) core clock speed based on a FMA operation.) (TFLOPS) (Note: GPUs based on RDNA 3 have dual-issue stream processors so that up to two shader instructions can be executed per clock cycle under certain parallelism conditions.)			Infinity Cache	Memory				TDP	Interface
Model (Code name)	Release date	Architecture & fab	Chiplets	Transistors & die size	Config (Note: Unified shaders : Texture mapping units : Render output units : Ray accelerators : AI accelerators and Compute units (CU))	Clock (MHz)	Texture (GT/s)	Pixel (GP/s)	Half (Note: Officially declared half-precision performance is twice of the one shown here due to being based on different operation (a×b+c×d+e).)	Single	Double	Infinity Cache	Size	Bandwidth (GB/s)	Bus type & width	Clock (MT/s)	TDP	Interface
Radeon RX 7600S (Navi 33)	Jan 4, 2023	RDNA 3 TSMC N6	Monolithic	13.3×10^{9} 204 mm^{2}	1792:112:64:28:56; 28 CU	1500; 2200	168.0; 246.4	96.00; 140.8	10.75; 15.77	10.75; 15.77	0.168; 0.246	32 MB	8 GB	256	GDDR6; 128-bit	16000	75 W	PCIe 4.0 ×8
Radeon RX 7600M (Navi 33)	Jan 4, 2023	RDNA 3 TSMC N6	Monolithic	13.3×10^{9} 204 mm^{2}	1792:112:64:28:56; 28 CU	1500; 2410	168.0; 269.9	96.0; 154.2	10.75; 17.28	10.75; 17.28	0.168; 0.270	32 MB	8 GB	256	GDDR6; 128-bit	16000	90 W	PCIe 4.0 ×8
Radeon RX 7600M XT (Navi 33)	Jan 4, 2023	RDNA 3 TSMC N6	Monolithic	13.3×10^{9} 204 mm^{2}	2048:128:64:32:64; 32 CU	1500; 2615	192.0; 334.1	96.00; 167.0	12.29; 21.42	12.29; 21.42	0.192; 0.335	32 MB	8 GB	288	GDDR6; 128-bit	18000	120 W	PCIe 4.0 ×8
Radeon RX 7700S (Navi 33)	Jan 4, 2023	RDNA 3 TSMC N6	Monolithic	13.3×10^{9} 204 mm^{2}	2048:128:64:32:64; 32 CU	1500; 2500	192.0; 320.0	96.0; 160.0	12.29; 20.48	12.29; 20.48	0.192; 0.320	32 MB	8 GB	288	GDDR6; 128-bit	18000	100 W	PCIe 4.0 ×8
Radeon RX 7800M (Navi 32)	Sep 11, 2024	RDNA 3 TSMC N5 (GCD); TSMC N6 (MCD)	1 × GCD; 3 × MCD	28.1×10^{9} 346 mm^{2}	3840:240:96:60:120; 60 CU	2335	560.4	224.2	35.87	35.87	0.560	48 MB	12 GB	432	GDDR6; 192-bit	18000	180 W	?
Radeon RX 7900M (Navi 31)	Oct 19, 2023	RDNA 3 TSMC N5 (GCD); TSMC N6 (MCD)	1 × GCD; 4 × MCD	57.7×10^{9} 529 mm^{2}	4608:288:192:72:144; 72 CU	1825; 2090	525.6; 601.9	350.4; 401.3	33.64; 38.52	33.64; 38.52	0.526; 0.602	64 MB	16 GB	576	GDDR6; 256-bit	18000	180 W	PCIe 4.0 ×16

== Workstation GPUs ==
=== FireGL series ===
Model	Launch	Micro-archi-tecture	Core	Fab (nm)	Bus interface	Core clock (MHz)	Memory clock (MHz)	Core config	Fillrate		Memory				Processing power (GFLOPS)	API compliance (version)			Notes
Model	Launch	Micro-archi-tecture	Core	Fab (nm)	Bus interface	Core clock (MHz)	Memory clock (MHz)	Core config	Pixel (GP/s)	Texture (GT/s)	Size (MB)	Bandwidth (GB/s)	Bus type	Bus width (bit)	Single precision	Direct3D	OpenGL	Vulkan	Notes
FireGL 8700	2001	R200	Radeon 8500	150	AGP	250	270	2:4:8:4^{1}	1	2	64	8.64	DDR	64 × 2	Unknown	8.1	1.4	—N/a	
FireGL 8800	2001	R200	Radeon 8500	150	AGP	300	290	2:4:8:4^{1}	1.2	2.4	128	9.28	DDR	64 × 2	Unknown	8.1	1.4	—N/a	
FireGL T2-64	2003	R300	Radeon 9600 Pro	130	AGP	325	200	2:4:4:4^{1}	1.3	1.3	64	6.4	DDR	128	Unknown	9.0	2.0	—N/a	
FireGL T2-128	2003	R300	Radeon 9600 Pro	130	AGP	400	320	2:4:4:4^{1}	1.6	1.6	128	10.2	DDR	128	Unknown	9.0	2.0	—N/a	
FireGL Z1-128	2002	R300	Radeon 9500 Pro	150	AGP	325	310	4:4:4:4^{1}	1.3	1.3	128	19.8	DDR	256	Unknown	9.0	2.0	—N/a	
FireGL X1-128	2002	R300	Radeon 9700	150	AGP	325	310	4:8:8:8^{1}	2.6	2.6	128	19.8	DDR	256	Unknown	9.0	2.0	—N/a	
FireGL X1-256	2002	R300	Radeon 9700 Pro	150	AGP Pro	325	310	4:8:8:8^{1}	2.6	2.6	256	19.8	DDR	256	Unknown	9.0	2.0	—N/a	
FireGL X2-256	2003	R300	Radeon 9800 Pro	150	AGP	380	350	4:8:8:8^{1}	3.04	3.04	256	22.4	DDR2	256	Unknown	9.0	2.0	—N/a	
FireGL X2-256T	2003	R300	Radeon 9800 XT	150	AGP	412	344	4:8:8:8^{1}	3.3	3.3	256	22.0	DDR2	256	Unknown	9.0	2.0	—N/a	
FireGL X3-256	2004	R300	Radeon X800 XT	130	AGP	450	450	6:12:12:12^{1}	5.4	5.4	256	28.8	GDDR3	256	Unknown	9.0b	2.0	—N/a	
FireGL V3100	2005	R300	Radeon X300 XT	110	PCIe x16	400	200	2:4:4:4^{1}	1.6	1.6	128	6.4	DDR	128	Unknown	9.0	2.0	—N/a	
FireGL V3200	2005	R300	Radeon X600 XT	130	PCIe x16	500	400	2:4:4:4^{1}	2	2	128	12.8	DDR2	128	Unknown	9.0b	2.0	—N/a	
FireGL V3300	2006	R500	Radeon 1300 Pro	90	PCIe x16	600	400	2:4:4:4^{1}	2.4	2.4	128	6.4	GDDR2	64	Unknown	9.0c	2.0	—N/a	
FireGL V3350	2006	R500	Radeon 1300 Pro	90	PCIe x16	600	400	2:4:4:4^{1}	2.4	2.4	256	6.4	GDDR2	64	Unknown	9.0c	2.0	—N/a	
FireGL V3400	2006	R500	Radeon 1600 Pro/XT	90	PCIe x16	500	500	5:12:4:4^{1}	2	2	128	16.0	GDDR3	128	Unknown	9.0c	2.0	—N/a	
FireGL V3600	2007	Tera-Scale 1	RV630 GL, HD 2600 Pro	65	PCIe x16	600	500	120^{2}(24×5):8:4:3	2.4	4.8	256	16.0	GDDR3	128	144	10	3.3	—N/a	Shader Model 4.0, APP Stream
FireGL V5000	2005	R400	Radeon X700 Pro/XT	130	PCIe x16	425	430	6:8:8:8^{1}	3.4	3.4	128	13.6	GDDR3	128	Unknown	9.0b	2.0	—N/a	
FireGL V5100	2005	R400	Radeon X800 Pro	130	PCIe x16	450	350	6:12:12:12^{1}	5.4	5.4	128	22.4	DDR	256	Unknown	9.0b	2.0	—N/a	
FireGL V5200	2005	R500	Radeon X1600 XT	90	PCIe x16	600	700	5:12:4:4^{1}	2.4	2.4	256	22.4	GDDR3	128	Unknown	9.0c	2.0	—N/a	
FireGL V5600	2007	Tera-Scale 1	R630 GL, HD 2600 XT	65	PCIe	800	1100	120^{2}(24×5):8:4:3	3.2	6.4	512	35.2	GDDR4	128	192	10	3.3	—N/a	Shader Model 4.0, APP Stream
FireGL V7100	2005	R400	Radeon X800 XT	130	PCIe	500	450	6:16:16:16^{1}	8	8	256	28.8	GDDR3	256	Unknown	9.0c	2.0	—N/a	
FireGL V7200	2006	R500	Radeon X1800 XT	90	PCIe ×16	600	650	6:16:16:16^{1}	9.6	9.6	256	41.6	GDDR3	256	Unknown	9.0c	2.0	—N/a	
FireGL V7300	2006	R500	R520 GL, X1800 XT	90	PCIe	600	650	6:16:16:16^{1}	9.6	9.6	512	41.6	GDDR3	256	Unknown	9.0c	2.0	—N/a	
FireGL V7350	2006	R500	R520 GL, X1800 XT	90	PCIe	600	650	6:16:16:16^{1}	9.6	9.6	1024	41.6	GDDR3	256	Unknown	9.0c	2.0	—N/a	
FireGL V7400	2006 (canceled)	R500	Radeon X1950 Pro	80	PCIe	550?	650?	8:36:16:16^{1}	19.8?	19.8?	512?	41.6?	GDDR3	256	Unknown	9.0c	2.0	—N/a	never released, superseded by 2007 series
FireGL V7600	2007	Tera-Scale 1	R600 GL, HD 2900 GT	80	PCIe	600	800	240^{2}(48×5):12:12:3	9.6	9.6	512	51.2	GDDR3	256	288	10	3.3	—N/a	Shader Model 4.0, APP Stream
FireGL V7700	2007 (2008)	Tera-Scale 1	R670 GL, HD 3870	55	PCIe 2.0	775	1125	320^{2}(64×5):16:16:4	12.4	12.4	512	72	GDDR4	256	496	10.1 (SM4.1)	3.3	—N/a	DisplayPort. Can do double precision computation via the AMD Stream SDK.
FireGL V8600	2007	Tera-Scale 1	R600 GL, HD 2900 XT	80	PCIe	688	868	320^{2}(64×5):16:16:4	11.01	11.01	1024	111.1	GDDR4	512	440.32	10	3.3	—N/a	Shader Model 4.0, APP Stream
FireGL V8650	2007	Tera-Scale 1	R600 GL, HD 2900 XT	80	PCIe	688	868	320^{2}(64×5):16:16:4	11.01	11.01	2048	111.1	GDDR4	512	440.32	10	3.3	—N/a	Shader Model 4.0, APP Stream

^{1} Vertex shaders : Pixel shaders : Texture mapping units : Render output units
^{2} Unified shaders : Texture mapping units : Render output units : Compute Units

=== FireMV (Multi-View) series ===
Model	Launch	Core	Bus interface	Core clock (MHz)	Memory clock (MHz)	Core config^{1}	Fillrate (GT/s)	Memory				API compliance (version)		TDP / idle (Watts)	Notes
Model	Launch	Core	Bus interface	Core clock (MHz)	Memory clock (MHz)	Core config^{1}	Fillrate (GT/s)	Size (MB)	Bandwidth (GB/s)	Bus type	Bus width (bit)	Direct3D	OpenGL	TDP / idle (Watts)	Notes
FireMV 2200 PCI	January 2006	RV280 GL	PCI	240	200	1:4:4:4	0.96	64	3.2	DDR	64	8.1	1.4	15	DMS-59 for dual DVI-D output
FireMV 2200 PCIe	January 2006	RV370	PCIe ×16	324	196	2:4:4:4	1.296	128	3.2	DDR	64	9.0	2.1	15	DMS-59 for dual DVI-D output
FireMV 2260	January 2008	RV620	PCIe 2.0 ×1/×16, PCI	600	500	40(8×5):4:4	2.4	256	32	DDR2	256	10.1	3.3	15/8	Dual DisplayPort (with adapters: DVI-D)
FireMV 2400 PCI	January 2008	RV380	PCI	500	500	2:4:4:4	2.0	128	16	DDR	128	9.0b	2.1	20	2× VHDCI for quad DVI-D output, VGA
FireMV 2400 PCIe	January 2008	RV380	PCIe ×1	500	500	2:4:4:4	2.0	256	16	DDR3	128	9.0b	2.1	20	2× VHDCI for quad DVI-D output, VGA

^{1} Vertex shaders : Pixel shaders : Texture mapping unit : Render output units
^{2} Unified shaders : Texture mapping unit : Render output units

=== FirePro (Multi-View) series ===
Model	Launch	Core	Fab (nm)	Transistors (million)	Die size (mm^{2})	Bus interface	Core clock (MHz)	Memory clock (MHz)	Core config^{1}	Fillrate		Memory				API compliance (version)		TDP / idle (watts)	Notes
Model	Launch	Core	Fab (nm)	Transistors (million)	Die size (mm^{2})	Bus interface	Core clock (MHz)	Memory clock (MHz)	Core config^{1}	Pixel (GP/s)	Texture (GT/s)	Size (MB)	Bandwidth (GB/s)	Bus type	Bus width (bit)	Direct3D	OpenGL (OpenCL)	TDP / idle (watts)	Notes
FirePro 2250	2007-01-01	RV516	80	107	100	PCIe x1/x16	600	500	2:4:4:4	2.4	0.3	256	32	DDR2	256	9.0c	2.1 (no)	20/11	DMS-59 for dual DVI-D output
FirePro 2270	2011-01-31	Cedar GL (RV810)	40	292	59	PCIe 2.1 x1/x16	600	600	80(16×5):8:4:1	2.4	4.8	512; 1024	9.6	GDDR3	64	11.0	4.3 (1.2)	15/8; 17/8	DMS-59 for dual output: DP or DVI-I or D-sub
FirePro 2450 Multi-View	2009-01-01	2× RV620 (Terascale 1)	55	2× 181	2× 61	PCIe 2.0 ×1/×16	600	600	2× 40(8×5):4:4:1	2.4	4.8	512	38.4	GDDR3	256	10.1	3.3 (APP)	36/18	2× VHDCI for quad output: DVI-I or D-sub
FirePro 2460 Multi-View	2010-04-01	Cedar GL (RV810) (Tera-scale2)	40	292	59	PCIe 2.1 ×16	500	500	80(16×5):8:4:1	2.0	4.0	512	32	GDDR5	64	11.0	4.3 (1.2)	17/13	4× Mini DP for quad output: DP or DVI-D, UVD2, PowerPlay, Eyefinity

=== FirePro 3D series (V000) ===
Model	Launch	Microarchitecture	Code name	Fab (nm)	Transistors (million)	Die size (mm^{2})	Bus interface	Clock rate		Core config^{1}	Fillrate		Memory				Processing power (GFLOPS)		API compliance (version)				TDP (Watts)	Notes
Model	Launch	Microarchitecture	Code name	Fab (nm)	Transistors (million)	Die size (mm^{2})	Bus interface	Core (MHz)	Memory (MHz)	Core config^{1}	Pixel (GP/s)	Texture (GT/s)	Size (MB)	Bandwidth (GB/s)	Bus type	Bus width (bit)	Single precision	Double precision	Direct3D	OpenGL	OpenCL	Vulkan	TDP (Watts)	Notes
FirePro 3D V3700	August 8, 2008	Terascale 1	RV620 PRO	55	181	67	PCIe 2.0 ×16	800	950	40(8×5):4:4:2	3.2	3.2	256	15.2	GDDR3	64	64	-	10.1	3.3 SM4.1	APP Stream only	—N/a	32	UVD+, PowerPlay
FirePro 3D V3750	September 11, 2008	Terascale 1	RV730 PRO	55	514	146	PCIe 2.0 ×16	550	750	320(64×5):32:8:4	4.4	17.6	256	24	GDDR3	128	352	-	10.1	3.3	1.0	—N/a	48	UVD+, PowerPlay
FirePro 3D V3800	April 26, 2010	TeraScale 2	Redwood Pro GL (RV830)	40	627	104	PCIe 2.1 ×16	650	900	400(80×5):20:8:5	5.2	13	512	14.4	GDDR3	64	520	?	11.0	4.3 SM5.0	1.2	—N/a	43	UVD2, PowerPlay, Eyefinity
FirePro 3D V4800	April 26, 2010	TeraScale 2	Redwood XT GL (RV830)	40	672	104	PCIe 2.1 ×16	775	900^{2}	400(80×5):20:8:5	6.2	15.5	1024	57.6	GDDR5^{2}	128	620	?	11.0	4.3	1.2	—N/a	69	UVD2, PowerPlay, Eyefinity
FirePro 3D V5700	August 8, 2008	TeraScale 1	RV730 XT	55	514	146	PCIe 2.0 ×16	700	900	320(64×5):32:8:4	5.6	22.4	512	28.8	GDDR3	128	448	-	10.1	3.3	1.0	—N/a	58	UVD2, PowerPlay
FirePro 3D V5800	April 26, 2010	TeraScale 2	Juniper XT GL (RV840)	40	1040	166	PCIe 2.1 ×16	700	1000^{2}	800(160×5):40:16:10	11.2	28	1024	64	GDDR5^{2}	128	1120	-	11.0	4.3	1.2	—N/a	74	UVD2, PowerPlay, Eyefinity
FirePro 3D V7750	March 27, 2009	TeraScale 1	RV730 XTX	55	514	146	PCIe 2.0 ×16	800	900	320(64×5):32:8:4	6.4	25.6	1024	28.8	GDDR3	128	512	-	10.1	3.3	1.0	—N/a	76	UVD2, PowerPlay
FirePro 3D V7800	April 26, 2010	TeraScale 2	Cypress Pro GL (RV870)	40	2154	334	PCIe 2.1 ×16	700	1000^{2}	1440(288×5):72:32:18	22.4	50.4	2048	128	GDDR5^{2}	256	2016	403.2	11.0	4.3	1.2	—N/a	138	UVD2, PowerPlay, Eyefinity
FirePro 3D V8700	September 11, 2008	TeraScale 1	RV770 XT	55	956	256	PCIe 2.1 ×16	750	850^{2}	800(160×5):40:16:10	12	30	1024	108.8	GDDR5^{2}	256	1200	240	10.1	3.3	1.0	—N/a	151	UVD2, PowerPlay
FirePro 3D V8750	July 28, 2009	TeraScale 1	RV770 XT	55	956	256	PCIe 2.1 ×16	750	900^{2}	800(160×5):40:16:10	12	30	2048	115.2	GDDR5^{2}	256	1200	240	10.1	3.3	1.0	—N/a	154	UVD2, PowerPlay
FirePro 3D V8800	April 7, 2010	TeraScale 2	Cypress XT GL (RV870)	40	2154	334	PCIe 2.1 ×16	825	1150^{2}	1600(320×5):80:32:20	26.4	66	2048	147.2	GDDR5^{2}	256	2640	528	11.0	4.3	1.2	—N/a	208	UVD2, PowerPlay, Eyefinity
FirePro 3D V9800	September 9, 2010	TeraScale 2	Cypress XT GL (RV870)	40	2154	334	PCIe 2.1 ×16	850	1150^{2}	1600(320×5):80:32:20	27.2	68	4096	147.2	GDDR5^{2}	256	2720	544	11.0	4.3	1.2	—N/a	225	UVD2, PowerPlay, Eyefinity

^{1} Unified shaders : Texture mapping units : Render output units : Compute Units
^{2} The effective data transfer rate of GDDR5 is quadruple its nominal clock, instead of double as it is with other DDR memory
^{3} Windows 7, 8.1, 10 Support for Fire Pro Cards with Terascale 2 and later by firepro driver 15.301.2601

=== FirePro series (Vx900) ===
Model	Launch	Microarchitecture	Code name	Fab (nm)	Bus interface	Clock rate		Core config^{1}	Fillrate		Memory				Processing power (GFLOPS)		API compliance (version)				TDP (Watts)	Notes
Model	Launch	Microarchitecture	Code name	Fab (nm)	Bus interface	Core (MHz)	Memory (MHz)	Core config^{1}	Pixel (GP/s)	Texture (GT/s)	Size (GiB)	Bandwidth (GB/s)	Bus type	Bus width (bit)	Single precision	Double precision	Direct3D	OpenGL	OpenCL	Vulkan	TDP (Watts)	Notes
FirePro V3900	February 7, 2012	TeraScale 2	Turks GL	40	PCIe 2.1 ×16	650	900	480(96×5):24:8:6	5.2	15.6	1	28.8	GDDR3	128	624	-	11.0	4.3	1.2	—N/a	50	HD3D, UVD3, DP 1.2, PowerPlay, Eyefinity
FirePro V4900	November 1, 2011	TeraScale 2	Turks XT GL	40	PCIe 2.1 ×16	800	1000	480(96×5):24:8:6	6.4	19.2	1	64	GDDR5^{2}	128	768	-	11.0	4.3	1.2	—N/a	<75 max	HD3D, UVD3, DP 1.2, PowerPlay, Eyefinity
FirePro V5900	May 24, 2011	TeraScale 3	Cayman LE GL	40	PCIe 2.1 ×16	600	500^{2}	512(128×4):32:32:8	19.2	19.2	2	64	GDDR5^{2}	256	610	154	11.0	4.3	1.2	—N/a	<75 max	HD3D, UVD3, DP 1.2, PowerPlay, Eyefinity
FirePro V7900	May 24, 2011	TeraScale 3	Cayman Pro GL	40	PCIe 2.1 ×16	725	1250^{2}	1280(320×4):80:32:20	23.2	58	2	160	GDDR5^{2}	256	1860	464	11.0	4.3	1.2	—N/a	<150 max	HD3D, UVD3, DP 1.2, PowerPlay, Eyefinity

^{1} Unified shaders : Texture mapping units : Render output units : Compute Units
^{2} The effective data transfer rate of GDDR5 is quadruple its nominal clock, instead of double as it is with other DDR memory.
^{3} Support for Windows 7, 8.1 for OpenGL 4.4 and OpenCL 2.0, when Hardware is prepared with firepro driver 14.502.1045

=== FirePro Workstation series (Wx000) ===
- Vulkan 1.0 and OpenGL 4.5 possible for GCN with Driver Update FirePro equal to Radeon Crimson 16.3 or higher.
- Vulkan 1.1 possible for GCN with Radeon Pro Software 18.Q1.1 or higher. It might not fully apply to GCN 1.0 or 1.1 GPUs.

Model	Launch	Microarchitecture	Code name	Fab (nm)	Bus interface	Clock rate		Core config^{1}	Fillrate		Memory				Processing power (GFLOPS)		API compliance (version)				TDP (Watts)	Notes
Model	Launch	Microarchitecture	Code name	Fab (nm)	Bus interface	Core (MHz)	Memory (MHz)	Core config^{1}	Pixel (GP/s)	Texture (GT/s)	Size (GiB)	Bandwidth (GB/s)	Bus type	Bus width (bit)	Single precision	Double precision	Direct3D	OpenGL	OpenCL	Vulkan	TDP (Watts)	Notes
FirePro W600	June 13, 2012	GCN 1st gen	Cape Verde Pro GL	28	PCIe 3.0 x16	750	1000	512:32:16:8	12.0	24.0	2	64	GDDR5	128	768	Up to 55	11.1/12	4.5	1.2	1.0	75	6× Mini DisplayPort
FirePro W5000	June 13, 2012	GCN 1st gen	Pitcairn LE GL	28	PCIe 3.0 x16	825	800	768:48:32:12	26.4	39.6	2	102.4	GDDR5	256	1267.2	79.2	11.1/12	4.5	1.2	1.0	<75	2× DisplayPort, 1× DVI-I
FirePro W7000	June 13, 2012	GCN 1st gen	Pitcairn XT GL	28	PCIe 3.0 x16	950	1200	1280:80:32:20	30.4	76.0	4	153.6	GDDR5	256	2432	152	11.1/12	4.5	1.2	1.0	<150	4× DisplayPort
FirePro W8000	June 14, 2012	GCN 1st gen	Tahiti PRO GL	28	PCIe 3.0 x16	900	1375	1792:112:32:28	28.8	100.8	4	176	GDDR5	256	3225.6	806.4	11.1/12	4.5	1.2	1.0	<225	ECC RAM, 4× DisplayPort + SDI-Link
FirePro W9000	June 14, 2012	GCN 1st gen	Tahiti XT GL	28	PCIe 3.0 x16	975	1375	2048:128:32:32	31.20	124.8	6	264	GDDR5	384	3993.6	998.4	11.1/12	4.5	1.2	1.0	274	ECC RAM, Six mini-DisplayPorts + SDI-Link

^{1} Unified shaders : Texture mapping units : Render output units : Compute Units
^{2} The effective data transfer rate of GDDR5 is quadruple its nominal clock, instead of double as it is with other DDR memory.
^{3} OpenGL 4.4: support with AMD FirePro driver release 14.301.000 or later, in footnotes of specs

=== FirePro D-Series ===
In 2014, AMD released the D-Series specifically for Mac Pro workstations.

Model	Launch	Microarchitecture	Code name	Fab (nm)	Bus interface	Clock rate		Core config^{1}	Fillrate		Memory				Processing power (GFLOPS)		API compliance (version)				TDP (Watts)	Notes
Model	Launch	Microarchitecture	Code name	Fab (nm)	Bus interface	Core (MHz)	Memory (MHz)	Core config^{1}	Pixel (GP/s)	Texture (GT/s)	Size (GiB)	Bandwidth (GB/s)	Bus type	Bus width (bit)	Single precision	Double precision	Direct3D	OpenGL	OpenCL	Vulkan	TDP (Watts)	Notes
FirePro D300	January 18, 2014	Southern Islands	Pitcairn XT GL	28	PCIe 3.0 ×16	850	1270	1280:80:32:20			2	162.6	GDDR5	256	2176	136	11.1	4.6	1.2	1.1.101	150	
FirePro D500	January 18, 2014	Southern Islands	Tahiti LE GL	28	PCIe 3.0 ×16	725	1270	1536:96:32:24			3	243.8	GDDR5	384	2227	556.8	11.1	4.6	1.2	1.1.101	274	
FirePro D700	January 18, 2014	Southern Islands	Tahiti XT GL	28	PCIe 3.0 ×16	850	1370	2048:128:32:32			6	263	GDDR5	384	3482	870.4	11.1	4.6	1.2	1.1.101	274	

^{1} Unified shaders : Texture mapping units : Render output units : compute units

=== FirePro Workstation series (Wx100) ===
- Vulkan 1.0 and OpenGL 4.5 possible for GCN with Driver Update FirePro equal to Radeon Crimson 16.3 or higher. OpenCL 2.1 and 2.2 possible for all OpenCL 2.0-Cards with Driver Update in Future (Khronos). Linux Support for OpenCL is limited with AMDGPU Driver 16.60 actual to Version 1.2.
- Vulkan 1.1 possible for GCN with Radeon Pro Software 18.Q1.1 or higher. It might not fully apply to GCN 1.0 or 1.1 GPUs.

Model	Launch	Micro-archi-tecture	Code name	Fab (nm)	Bus interface	Clock rate		Core config^{1}	Fillrate		Memory				Processing power (GFLOPS)		API compliance (version)				TDP (Watts)	Notes
Model	Launch	Micro-archi-tecture	Code name	Fab (nm)	Bus interface	Core (MHz)	Memory (MHz)	Core config^{1}	Pixel (GP/s)	Texture (GT/s)	Size (GiB)	Bandwidth (GB/s)	Bus type	Bus width (bit)	Single precision	Double precision	Direct3D	OpenGL	OpenCL	Vulkan	TDP (Watts)	Notes
FirePro W2100	August 13, 2014	GCN 1st gen	Oland XT	28	PCIe 3.0 x8	630	900	320:20:8:5	5.04	12.6	2	28.8	DDR3	128	403.2	25.5	11.2a/12.0	4.5	2.0 (new)	1.0	<26	2× Standard DisplayPort DP 1.2a outputs
FirePro W4100	August 13, 2014	GCN 1st gen	Cape Verde	28	PCIe 3.0 ×16	630	1125	512:32:16:8	10.08	20.16	2	72	GDDR5	128	645.1	40.3	11.2a/12.0	4.5	2.0 (new)	1.0	<50	4× Standard Mini-DP 1.2a outputs
FirePro W5100	August 13, 2014	GCN 2nd gen	Bonaire Pro	28	PCIe 3.0 ×16	930	1500	768:48:16:12	14.88	44.64	4	96	GDDR5	128	1430	89.2	11.2b/12.0	4.5	2.0	1.0	<75	DirectGMA, GeometryBoost, 4 DP 1.2a, including Adaptive-Sync and HBR2
FirePro W7100	August 13, 2014	GCN 3rd gen	Tonga Pro GL	28	PCIe 3.0 ×16	920	1400	1792:112:32:28	29.4	103	8	160	GDDR5	256	3297	206	11.2b/12.0	4.5	2.0	1.1	<150	DirectGMA, GeometryBoost, 4 DP 1.2a, including Adaptive-Sync and HBR2
FirePro W8100	June 26, 2014	GCN 2nd gen	Hawaii Pro GL	28	PCIe 3.0 ×16	824	1250	2560:160:64:40	52.7	145	8	320	GDDR5	512	4218.9	2109.45	11.2b/12.0	4.5	2.0	1.0	220	ECC RAM, 4 DP + SDI-Link
FirePro W9100	March 26, 2014	GCN 2nd gen	Hawaii XT	28	PCIe 3.0 ×16	930	1250	2816:176:64:44	59.5	163.7	16; 32	320	GDDR5	512	5237.8	2618.9	11.2b/12.0	4.5	2.0	1.0	275	ECC RAM, 6× Mini DisplayPort + SDI-Link

^{1} Unified shaders : Texture mapping units : Render output units : compute units
^{2} The effective data transfer rate of GDDR5 is quadruple its nominal clock, instead of double as it is with other DDR memory.
^{3} OpenGL 4.4: support with AMD FirePro driver release 14.301.000 or later, in footnotes of specs

=== FirePro Workstation series (Wx300) ===
- Vulkan 1.1 possible for GCN with Radeon Pro Software 18.Q1.1 or higher. It might not fully apply to GCN 1.0 or 1.1 GPUs.

Model	Launch	Code name	Fab (nm)	Bus interface	Clock rate		Core config^{1}	Fillrate		Memory				Processing power (GFLOPS)		API compliance (version)				TDP (Watts)	Notes
Model	Launch	Code name	Fab (nm)	Bus interface	Core (MHz)	Memory (MHz)	Core config^{1}	Pixel (GP/s)	Texture (GT/s)	Size (GiB)	Bandwidth (GB/s)	Bus type	Bus width (bit)	Single precision	Double precision	Direct3D	OpenGL	OpenCL	Vulkan	TDP (Watts)	Notes
FirePro W4300	December 1, 2015	Bonaire PRO (GCN 2nd Gen)	28	PCIe 3.0 x16	930	1500	768:48:16:12	14.88	44.64	4	96	GDDR5	128	1428.5	89.3	11.2/12.0 SM 5.0	4.5	2.0 (2.1 beta, 2.2 possible)	1.0	<50	4 Mini DisplayPort 1.2a outputs, low profile

=== Radeon PRO series ===
Model (Code name)	Release date & price	Architecture & fab	Transistors & die size	Core		Fillrate (Note: Boost values (if available) are stated below the base value in italic.) (Note: Texture fillrate is calculated as the number of Texture Mapping Units multiplied by the base (or boost) core clock speed.) (Note: Pixel fillrate is calculated as the number of Render Output Units multiplied by the base (or boost) core clock speed.)		Processing power (Note: Precision performance is calculated from the base (or boost) core clock speed based on a FMA operation.) (GFLOPS)			Memory				TBP	Bus interface	Graphic output ports
Model (Code name)	Release date & price	Architecture & fab	Transistors & die size	Config (Note: Unified shaders : Texture mapping units : Render output units and Compute units (CU))	Clock (MHz)	Texture (GT/s)	Pixel (GP/s)	Half	Single	Double	Size	Bandwidth (GB/s)	Bus type & width	Clock (MT/s)	TBP	Bus interface	Graphic output ports
Radeon Pro Duo (Fiji)	Apr 26, 2016 $1,499 USD	GCN 3 TSMC 28 nm	2× / 8.9×10^{9} 596 mm^{2}	2× / 4096:256:64; 64 CU	1000	2× 256.0	2× 64.00	2× 8,192	2× 8,192	2× 512.0	2× 4 GB	2× 512	HBM; 2× 4096-bit	1000	350 W	PCIe 3.0 ×16	3× DP 1.2; 1× HDMI 1.4a
Radeon Pro Duo (Polaris 10)	Apr 24, 2017 $999 USD	GCN 4 GloFo 14 nm	2× / 5.7×10^{9} 232 mm^{2}	2× / 2304:128:32; 36 CU	1243	2× 179.0	2× 39.78	2× 5,728	2× 5,728	2× 358.0	2× 16 GB	2× 224	GDDR5; 2× 256-bit	7000	250 W	PCIe 3.0 ×16	3× DP 1.4a 1× HDMI 2.0b
Radeon Pro SSG (Fiji)	Jul 26, 2016 prototype only $9,999 USD	GCN 3 TSMC 28 nm	8.9×10^{9} 596 mm^{2}	4096:256:64; 64 CU	1050	268.8	67.20	8,601	8,601	537.6	4 GB +1 TB SSD	512	HBM + SSG; 4096-bit	1000	200 W	PCIe 3.0 ×16	4× DP 1.2
Radeon Pro SSG (Vega 10)	Aug 8, 2017 $6,999 USD	GCN 5 GloFo 14 nm	12.5×10^{9} 495 mm^{2}	4096:256:64; 64 CU	1440; 1500	368.6; 384.0	92.16; 96.00	23,593; 24,576	11,796; 12,288	737.2; 768.0	16 GB +2 TB SSD	484	HBM2 + SSG; 2048-bit	1890	230 W	PCIe 3.0 ×16	6× miniDP 1.4a
Radeon Vega Frontier Edition (Vega 10)	Jun 27, 2017 $999 USD	GCN 5 GloFo 14 nm	12.5×10^{9} 495 mm^{2}	4096:256:64; 64 CU	1382; 1600	353.8; 409.6	88.4; 102.4	22,643; 26,214	11,321; 13,107	707.6; 819.2	16 GB	484	HBM2; 2048-bit	1890	300 W	PCIe 3.0 ×16	3× DP 1.4a 1× HDMI 2.0b
Radeon Vega Frontier Edition (Liquid-cooled) (Vega 10)	Jun 27, 2017 $1,499 USD	GCN 5 GloFo 14 nm	12.5×10^{9} 495 mm^{2}	4096:256:64; 64 CU	1382; 1600	353.8; 409.6	88.4; 102.4	22,643; 26,214	11,321; 13,107	707.6; 819.2	16 GB	484	HBM2; 2048-bit	1890	375 W	PCIe 3.0 ×16	3× DP 1.4a 1× HDMI 2.0b

=== Radeon Pro WX x100 series ===
- Vulkan 1.1 possible for GCN with Radeon Pro software 18.Q1.1 or higher.

Model (Code name)	Release date & price	Architecture & fab	Transistors & die size	Core		Fillrate (Note: Boost values (if available) are stated below the base value in italic.) (Note: Texture fillrate is calculated as the number of Texture Mapping Units multiplied by the base (or boost) core clock speed.) (Note: Pixel fillrate is calculated as the number of Render Output Units multiplied by the base (or boost) core clock speed.)		Processing power (Note: Precision performance is calculated from the base (or boost) core clock speed based on a FMA operation.) (GFLOPS)			Memory				TBP	Bus interface	Graphic output ports
Model (Code name)	Release date & price	Architecture & fab	Transistors & die size	Config (Note: Unified shaders : Texture mapping units : Render output units and Compute units (CU))	Clock (MHz)	Texture (GT/s)	Pixel (GP/s)	Half	Single	Double	Size (GB)	Bandwidth (GB/s)	Bus type & width	Clock (MT/s)	TBP	Bus interface	Graphic output ports
Radeon Pro WX 2100 (Polaris 12)	Jun 1, 2017 $149 USD	GCN 4 GloFo 14 nm	2.2×10^{9} 103 mm^{2}	512:32:16; 8 CU	925; 1219	29.6; 39.0	14.8; 19.5	947; 1,250	947; 1,250	59.2; 78	2	48	GDDR5; 64-bit	6000	35 W	PCIe 3.0 ×8	1× DP 1.4a 2× miniDP 1.4a
Radeon Pro WX 3100 (Polaris 12)	Jun 1, 2017 $199 USD	GCN 4 GloFo 14 nm	2.2×10^{9} 103 mm^{2}	512:32:16; 8 CU	925; 1219	29.6; 39.0	14.8; 19.5	947; 1,250	947; 1,250	59.2; 78	4	96	GDDR5; 128-bit	6000	50 W	PCIe 3.0 ×8	1× DP 1.4a 2× miniDP 1.4a
Radeon Pro WX 4100 (Polaris 11)	Nov 10, 2016 $399 USD	GCN 4 GloFo 14 nm	3.0×10^{9} 123 mm^{2}	1024:64:16; 16 CU	1125; 1201	72; 76.9	18; 19.2	2,304; 2,460	2,304; 2,460	144; 154	4	96	GDDR5; 128-bit	7000	50 W	PCIe 3.0 ×8	4× miniDP 1.4a
Radeon Pro WX 5100 (Polaris 10)	Nov 18, 2016 $499 USD	GCN 4 GloFo 14 nm	5.7×10^{9} 232 mm^{2}	1792:112:32; 28 CU	713; 1086	79.85; 121.6	22.8; 34.75	2,555; 3,892	2,555; 3,892	159.7; 243.3	8	160	GDDR5; 256-bit	5000	75 W	PCIe 3.0 ×16	4× DP 1.4a
Radeon Pro WX 7100 (Polaris 10)	Nov 10, 2016 $799 USD	GCN 4 GloFo 14 nm	5.7×10^{9} 232 mm^{2}	2304:144:32; 36 CU	1188; 1243	171; 179	38; 39.78	4,150; 5,728	5,474; 5,728	342.1; 358	8	224	GDDR5; 256-bit	7000	130 W	PCIe 3.0 ×16	4× DP 1.4a
Radeon Pro WX 9100 (Vega 10)	Sep 13, 2017 $2,199 USD	GCN 5 GloFo 14 nm	12.5×10^{9} 495mm^{2}	4096:256:64; 64 CU	1200; 1500	307.2; 384.0	76.8; 96.0	19,660; 24,576	9,830; 12,288	614.4; 768	16	484	HBM2; 2048-bit	1890	230 W	PCIe 3.0 ×16	6× miniDP 1.4a

=== Radeon Pro WX x200 series ===
Model (Code name)	Release date & price	Architecture & fab	Transistors & die size	Core		Fillrate (Note: Boost values (if available) are stated below the base value in italic.) (Note: Texture fillrate is calculated as the number of Texture Mapping Units multiplied by the base (or boost) core clock speed.) (Note: Pixel fillrate is calculated as the number of Render Output Units multiplied by the base (or boost) core clock speed.)		Processing power (Note: Precision performance is calculated from the base (or boost) core clock speed based on a FMA operation.) (GFLOPS)			Memory				TBP	Bus interface	Graphic output ports
Model (Code name)	Release date & price	Architecture & fab	Transistors & die size	Config (Note: Unified shaders : Texture mapping units : Render output units and Compute units (CU))	Clock (MHz)	Texture (GT/s)	Pixel (GP/s)	Half	Single	Double	Size (GB)	Bandwidth (GB/s)	Bus type & width	Clock (MT/s)	TBP	Bus interface	Graphic output ports
Radeon Pro WX 3200 (Polaris 23)	Jul 2, 2019 $199 USD	GCN 4 GloFo 14 nm	2.2×10^{9} 103mm^{2}	640:32:16; 10 CU	1295	41.44	20.72	1,658	1,658	103.6	4	96	GDDR5; 128-bit	6000	50 W	PCIe 3.0 ×8	4× mini-DP 1.4a
Radeon Pro WX 8200 (Vega 10)	Aug 13, 2018 $999 USD	GCN 5 GloFo 14 nm	12.5×10^{9} 495mm^{2}	3584:224:64; 56 CU	1200; 1500	268.8; 336.0	76.8; 96.00	17,203; 21,504	8,601; 10,752	537.6; 672.0	8	512	HBM2; 2048-bit	2000	230 W	PCIe 3.0 ×16	4× mini-DP 1.4a

=== Radeon Pro Vega series ===
Model (Code name)	Release date & price	Architecture & fab	Transistors & die size	Core		Fillrate (Note: Boost values (if available) are stated below the base value in italic.) (Note: Texture fillrate is calculated as the number of Texture Mapping Units multiplied by the base (or boost) core clock speed.) (Note: Pixel fillrate is calculated as the number of Render Output Units multiplied by the base (or boost) core clock speed.)		Processing power (Note: Precision performance is calculated from the base (or boost) core clock speed based on a FMA operation.) (GFLOPS)			Memory				TBP	Bus interface	Graphic output ports
Model (Code name)	Release date & price	Architecture & fab	Transistors & die size	Config (Note: Unified shaders : Texture mapping units : Render output units and Compute units (CU))	Clock (MHz)	Texture (GT/s)	Pixel (GP/s)	Half	Single	Double	Size (GB)	Bandwidth (GB/s)	Bus type & width	Clock (MT/s)	TBP	Bus interface	Graphic output ports
Radeon Pro Vega II (Vega 20)	2019 $2,800 USD	GCN 5 TSMC 7 nm	13.23×10^{9} 331 mm^{2}	4096:256:64; 64 CU	1720	440.3	110.1	28,180	14,090	880	32	1024	HBM2; 4096-bit	2000	475 W	PCIe 3.0 ×16	4× Thunderbolt 3 (USB Type-C); 1× HDMI 2.0b
Radeon Pro Vega II Duo (Vega 20)	2019 $5,600 USD	GCN 5 TSMC 7 nm	13.23×10^{9} 331 mm^{2}	2× / 4096:256:64; 64 CU	1720	2× 440.3	2× 110.1	2× 28,180	2× 14,090	2× 880	2× 32	2× 1024	HBM2; 2× 4096-bit	2000	475 W	PCIe 3.0 ×16	4× Thunderbolt 3 (USB Type-C); 1× HDMI 2.0b

=== Radeon Pro 5000 series ===
Model (Code name)	Release date	Architecture & fab	Transistors & die size	Core		Fillrate (Note: Boost values (if available) are stated below the base value in italic.) (Note: Texture fillrate is calculated as the number of Texture Mapping Units multiplied by the base (or boost) core clock speed.) (Note: Pixel fillrate is calculated as the number of Render Output Units multiplied by the base (or boost) core clock speed.)		Processing power (Note: Precision performance is calculated from the base (or boost) core clock speed based on a FMA operation.) (GFLOPS)			Memory				TDP	Bus interface
Model (Code name)	Release date	Architecture & fab	Transistors & die size	Config (Note: Unified shaders : Texture mapping units : Render output units and Compute units (CU))	Clock (MHz)	Texture (GT/s)	Pixel (GP/s)	Half	Single	Double	Size (GB)	Bandwidth (GB/s)	Bus type & width	Clock (MT/s)	TDP	Bus interface
Radeon Pro 5300 (Navi 14)	Aug 4, 2020	RDNA; TSMC N7	6.4×10^{9} 158 mm^{2}	1280:80:32; 20 CU	1000; 1650	80; 132	32; 52.8	5,120; 8,448	2,560; 4,224	160; 264	4	224	GDDR6; 128-bit	14000	130 W	PCIe 4.0 ×8
Radeon Pro 5500 XT (Navi 14)	Aug 4, 2020	RDNA; TSMC N7	6.4×10^{9} 158 mm^{2}	1536:96:32; 24 CU	1187; 1757	114; 168.7	38; 56.2	7,292; 10,796	3,646; 5,398	227.9; 337.3	8	224	GDDR6; 128-bit	14000	130 W	PCIe 4.0 ×8
Radeon Pro 5700 (Navi 10)	Aug 4, 2020	RDNA; TSMC N7	10.3×10^{9} 251 mm^{2}	2304:144:64; 36 CU	1243; 1350	179; 194.4	79.6; 86.4	11,456; 12,442	5,728; 6,221	358; 388.8	8	384	GDDR6; 256-bit	12000	130 W	PCIe 4.0 ×16
Radeon Pro 5700 XT (Navi 10)	Aug 4, 2020	RDNA; TSMC N7	10.3×10^{9} 251 mm^{2}	2560:160:64; 40 CU	1243; 1499	198.9; 239.8	79.6; 95.94	12,728; 15,350	6,364; 7,675	397.8; 479.7	16	384	GDDR6; 256-bit	12000	130 W	PCIe 4.0 ×16

=== Radeon Pro W5000 series ===
Model (Code name)	Release date & price	Architecture & fab	Transistors & die size	Core		Fillrate (Note: Boost values (if available) are stated below the base value in italic.) (Note: Texture fillrate is calculated as the number of Texture Mapping Units multiplied by the base (or boost) core clock speed.) (Note: Pixel fillrate is calculated as the number of Render Output Units multiplied by the base (or boost) core clock speed.)		Processing power (Note: Precision performance is calculated from the base (or boost) core clock speed based on a FMA operation.) (GFLOPS)			Memory				TDP	Bus interface	Graphic output ports
Model (Code name)	Release date & price	Architecture & fab	Transistors & die size	Config (Note: Unified shaders : Texture mapping units : Render output units and Compute units (CU))	Clock (MHz)	Texture (GT/s)	Pixel (GP/s)	Half	Single	Double	Size (GB)	Bandwidth (GB/s)	Bus type & width	Clock (MT/s)	TDP	Bus interface	Graphic output ports
Radeon Pro W5500 (Navi 14)	Feb 10, 2020 $399 USD	RDNA; TSMC N7	6.4×10^{9} 158 mm^{2}	1408:88:32; 22 CU	1744; 1855	153.4; 163.2	55.8; 59.36	9,822; 10,450	4,911; 5,224	306.9; 326.5	8	224	GDDR6; 128-bit	14000	125 W	PCIe 4.0 ×8	4× DP 1.4a
Radeon Pro W5700 (Navi 10)	Nov 19, 2019 $799 USD	RDNA; TSMC N7	10.3×10^{9} 251 mm^{2}	2304:144:64; 36 CU	1400; 1880	201.6; 270.7	89.6; 120.3	12,902; 17,330	6,451; 8,663	403.2; 541.4	8	448	GDDR6; 256-bit	14000	205 W	PCIe 4.0 ×16	5× miniDP 1.4a 1× USB Type-C

Model (Code name)	Release date	Architecture & fab	Transistors & die size	Core		Fillrate (Note: Boost values (if available) are stated below the base value in italic.) (Note: Texture fillrate is calculated as the number of Texture Mapping Units multiplied by the base (or boost) core clock speed.) (Note: Pixel fillrate is calculated as the number of Render Output Units multiplied by the base (or boost) core clock speed.)		Processing power (Note: Precision performance is calculated from the base (or boost) core clock speed based on a FMA operation.) (GFLOPS)			Memory				TDP	Bus interface	Graphic output ports
Model (Code name)	Release date	Architecture & fab	Transistors & die size	Config (Note: Unified shaders : Texture mapping units : Render output units and Compute units (CU))	Clock (MHz)	Texture (GT/s)	Pixel (GP/s)	Half	Single	Double	Size (GB)	Bandwidth (GB/s)	Bus type & width	Clock (MT/s)	TDP	Bus interface	Graphic output ports
Radeon Pro W5500X (Navi 14)	2020	RDNA; TSMC N7	6.4×10^{9} 158 mm^{2}	1536:96:32; 24 CU	1757	163.2	59.36	11,200	5,600	326.5	8	224	GDDR6; 128-bit	14000	130 W	PCIe 4.0 ×8	2× HDMI 2.0b
Radeon Pro W5700X (Navi 10)	Dec 11, 2019	RDNA; TSMC N7	10.3×10^{9} 251 mm^{2}	2560:160:64; 40 CU	1243; 1860	198.8; 297.6	79.5; 119.04	12,728; 19,046	6,364; 9,523	397.8; 595.2	16	448	GDDR6; 256-bit	14000	250 W	PCIe 4.0 ×16	4× Thunderbolt 3; 1× HDMI 2.0b

=== Radeon Pro W6000 series ===
Model (Code name)	Release date & price	Architecture & fab	Transistors & die size	Core		Fillrate (Note: Boost values (if available) are stated below the base value in italic.) (Note: Texture fillrate is calculated as the number of Texture Mapping Units multiplied by the base (or boost) core clock speed.) (Note: Pixel fillrate is calculated as the number of Render Output Units multiplied by the base (or boost) core clock speed.)		Processing power (Note: Precision performance is calculated from the base (or boost) core clock speed based on a FMA operation.) (GFLOPS)			Infinity Cache	Memory				TDP	Bus interface	Graphic output ports
Model (Code name)	Release date & price	Architecture & fab	Transistors & die size	Config (Note: Unified shaders : Texture mapping units : Render output units : Ray accelerators and Compute units (CU))	Clock (MHz)	Texture (GT/s)	Pixel (GP/s)	Half	Single	Double	Infinity Cache	Size (GB)	Bandwidth (GB/s)	Bus type & width	Clock (MT/s)	TDP	Bus interface	Graphic output ports
Radeon Pro W6300 (Navi 24)	Oct 2022; OEM	RDNA 2 TSMC N6	5.4×10^{9} 107 mm^{2}	768:48:32:12; 12 CU	1512; 2040	72.58; 97.92	48.38; 65.28	4,644; 6,267	2,322; 3,133	145.1; 195.8	8 MB	2	64	GDDR6; 32-bit	16000	25 W	PCIe 4.0 ×4	2× DP 1.4a
Radeon Pro W6400 (Navi 24)	Jan 19, 2022 $229 USD	RDNA 2 TSMC N6	5.4×10^{9} 107 mm^{2}	768:48:32:12; 12 CU	2039; 2331	97.87; 111.9	65.25; 74.59	6,264; 7,161	3,132; 3,580	195.7; 223.8	16 MB	4	128	GDDR6; 64-bit	16000	50 W	PCIe 4.0 ×4	2× DP 1.4a
Radeon Pro W6600 (Navi 23)	Jun 8, 2021 $649 USD	RDNA 2 TSMC N7	11.06×10^{9} 237 mm^{2}	1792:112:64:28; 28 CU	2331; 2903	261.1; 325.1	149.2; 185.8	16,709; 20,809	8,354; 10,404	522.1; 650.3	32 MB	8	224	GDDR6; 128-bit	14000	130 W	PCIe 4.0 ×8	4× DP 1.4a
Radeon Pro W6800 (Navi 21)	Jun 8, 2021 $2249 USD	RDNA 2 TSMC N7	26.8×10^{9} 520 mm^{2}	3840:240:96:60; 60 CU	2075; 2320	498.0; 556.8	199.2; 222.7	31,872; 35,635	15,936; 17,818	996.0; 1,114	128 MB	32	512	GDDR6; 256-bit	16000	250 W	PCIe 4.0 ×16	6× miniDP 1.4a

Model (Code name)	Release date	Architecture & fab	Transistors & die size	Core		Fillrate (Note: Boost values (if available) are stated below the base value in italic.) (Note: Texture fillrate is calculated as the number of Texture Mapping Units multiplied by the base (or boost) core clock speed.) (Note: Pixel fillrate is calculated as the number of Render Output Units multiplied by the base (or boost) core clock speed.)		Processing power (Note: Precision performance is calculated from the base (or boost) core clock speed based on a FMA operation.) (GFLOPS)			Infinity Cache	Memory				TDP	Bus interface	Graphic output ports
Model (Code name)	Release date	Architecture & fab	Transistors & die size	Config (Note: Unified shaders : Texture mapping units : Render output units : Ray accelerators and Compute units (CU))	Clock (MHz)	Texture (GT/s)	Pixel (GP/s)	Half	Single	Double	Infinity Cache	Size (GB)	Bandwidth (GB/s)	Bus type & width	Clock (MT/s)	TDP	Bus interface	Graphic output ports
Radeon Pro W6600X (Navi 23)	Mar 8, 2022	RDNA 2 TSMC N7	11.06×10^{9} 237 mm^{2}	2048:124:64:32; 32 CU	2068; 2479	307.3	158.6	19,673	9,837	614.8	32 MB	8	256	GDDR6; 128-bit	16000	120 W	PCIe 4.0 ×8	2× HDMI 2.1
Radeon Pro W6800X (Navi 21)	Aug 3, 2021	RDNA 2 TSMC N7	26.8×10^{9} 520 mm^{2}	3840:240:96:60; 60 CU	1800; 2087	432.0; 500.8	172.8; 200.3	27,648; 32,056	13,824; 16,028	864.0; 1,002	128 MB	32	512	GDDR6; 256-bit	16000	300 W	PCIe 4.0 ×16	4× Thunderbolt 3; 1× HDMI 2.1
Radeon Pro W6800X Duo (Navi 21)	Aug 3, 2021	RDNA 2 TSMC N7	2× / 26.8×10^{9} 520 mm^{2}	2× / 3840:240:96:60; 60 CU	1800; 1979	2× / 432.0; 474.9	2× / 172.8; 189.9	2× / 27,648; 30,397	2× / 13,824; 15,199	2× / 864.0; 949.9	128 MB	2× 32	2× 512	GDDR6; 2× 256-bit	16000	400 W	PCIe 4.0 ×16	4× Thunderbolt 3; 1× HDMI 2.1
Radeon Pro W6900X (Navi 21)	Aug 3, 2021	RDNA 2 TSMC N7	26.8×10^{9} 520 mm^{2}	5120:320:128:80; 80 CU	1825; 2171	584.0; 694.7	233.6; 277.8	37,376; 44,462	18,688; 22,231	1,168; 1,389	128 MB	32	512	GDDR6; 256-bit	16000	300 W	PCIe 4.0 ×16	4× Thunderbolt 3; 1× HDMI 2.1

=== Radeon Pro W7000 series ===
Model (Code name)	Release date & price	Architecture & fab	Chiplets (active)	Transistors & die size (Note: Approximate die size of entire MCM package that consists of single GCD (Graphics Compute Die) and six MCDs (Memory Cache Die). Radeon Pro W7800 has only four active MCDs, inactive one is for structural support and heat dissipation.)	Core		Fillrate (Note: Boost values (if available) are stated below the base value in italic.) (Note: Texture fillrate is calculated as the number of Texture Mapping Units multiplied by the base (or boost) core clock speed.) (Note: Pixel fillrate is calculated as the number of Render Output Units multiplied by the base (or boost) core clock speed.)		Processing power (Note: Precision performance is calculated from the base (or boost) core clock speed based on a FMA operation.) (TFLOPS)			Infinity Cache	Memory				TDP	Bus interface
Model (Code name)	Release date & price	Architecture & fab	Chiplets (active)	Transistors & die size	Config (Note: Unified shaders : Texture mapping units : Render output units : Ray accelerators : AI accelerators and Compute units (CU)) (Note: GPUs based on RDNA 3 have dual-issue stream processors so that up to two shader instructions can be executed per clock cycle under certain parallelism conditions.)	Clock (MHz)	Texture (GT/s)	Pixel (GP/s)	Half	Single	Double	Infinity Cache	Size (GB)	Bandwidth (GB/s)	Bus type & width	Clock (MT/s)	TDP	Bus interface
Radeon Pro W7500 (Navi 33)	Aug 3, 2023 $429 USD	RDNA 3 TSMC N6	—N/a	13.3×10^{9} 204 mm^{2}	1792:112:64; 28:56:28 CU	1500; 1700	168.0; 190.4	96.0; 108.8	24.37	12.19	0.381	32 MB	8	288	GDDR6; 128-bit	18000	70 W	PCIe 4.0 ×8
Radeon Pro W7600 (Navi 33)	Aug 3, 2023 $599 USD	RDNA 3 TSMC N6	—N/a	13.3×10^{9} 204 mm^{2}	2048:128:64; 32:64:32 CU	1720; 2440	220.1; 312.3	110.0; 156.2	39.98	19.99	0.625	32 MB	8	288	GDDR6; 128-bit	18000	130 W	PCIe 4.0 ×8
Radeon Pro W7700 (Navi 32)	Nov 13, 2023 $999 USD	RDNA 3 TSMC N5 (GCD); TSMC N6 (MCD)	1 × GCD; 4 × MCD	28.1×10^{9} ~346 mm^{2}	3072:192:96; 48:96:48 CU	1900; 2600	364.8; 499.2	182.4; 249.2	56.54	28.3	0.884	64 MB	16	576	GDDR6; 256-bit	18000	190 W	PCIe 4.0 ×16
Radeon Pro W7800 (Navi 31)	Apr 13, 2023 $2499 USD	RDNA 3 TSMC N5 (GCD); TSMC N6 (MCD)	1 × GCD; 4 × MCD	57.7×10^{9} ~531 mm^{2}	4480:280:128; 70:128:70 CU	1855; 2499	519.4; 699.7	237.4; 319.8	90.50	45.25	1.414	64 MB	32	576	GDDR6; 256-bit	18000	260 W	PCIe 4.0 ×16
Radeon Pro W7800 48GB (Navi 31)	Dec 2024	RDNA 3 TSMC N5 (GCD); TSMC N6 (MCD)	1 × GCD; 6 × MCD	57.7×10^{9} ~531 mm^{2}	4480:280:128; 70:128:70 CU	1855; 2499	519.4; 699.7	237.4; 319.8	90.50	45.25	1.414	96 MB	48	864	GDDR6; 384-bit	18000	281 W	PCIe 4.0 ×16
Radeon Pro W7900 Dual Slot (Navi 31)	Jun 19, 2024 $3499 USD	RDNA 3 TSMC N5 (GCD); TSMC N6 (MCD)	1 × GCD; 6 × MCD	57.7×10^{9} ~531 mm^{2}	6144:384:192; 96:192:96 CU	1855; 2495	712.3; 958.0	356.1; 479.0	122.6	61.32	1.916	96 MB	48	864	GDDR6; 384-bit	18000	295 W	PCIe 4.0 ×16
Radeon Pro W7900 (Navi 31)	Apr 13, 2023 $3999 USD	RDNA 3 TSMC N5 (GCD); TSMC N6 (MCD)	1 × GCD; 6 × MCD	57.7×10^{9} ~531 mm^{2}	6144:384:192; 96:192:96 CU	1855; 2495	712.3; 958.0	356.1; 479.0	122.6	61.32	1.916	96 MB	48	864	GDDR6; 384-bit	18000	295 W	PCIe 4.0 ×16

=== Radeon Pro R9000 series ===
Model (Code name)	Release date	Architecture & fab	Transistors & die size	Core		Fillrate (Note: Boost values (if available) are stated below the base value in italic.) (Note: Texture fillrate is calculated as the number of Texture Mapping Units multiplied by the base (or boost) core clock speed.) (Note: Pixel fillrate is calculated as the number of Render Output Units multiplied by the base (or boost) core clock speed.)		Processing power						Infinity Cache	Memory				TBP	Bus interface
Model (Code name)	Release date	Architecture & fab	Transistors & die size	Core		Fillrate		(TFLOPS) (Note: Precision performance is calculated from the base (or boost) core clock speed based on a FMA operation.)			AI TOPS (Note: Officially declared performance is twice the one shown here due to the use of sparsity.)			Infinity Cache	Memory				TBP	Bus interface
Model (Code name)	Release date	Architecture & fab	Transistors & die size	Config (Note: Unified shaders : Texture mapping units : Render output units : Ray accelerators : AI accelerators and Compute units (CU))	Clock (MHz)	Texture (GT/s)	Pixel (GP/s)	Half	Single	Double	FP8	INT8	INT4	Infinity Cache	Size (GB)	Bandwidth (GB/s)	Bus type & width	Clock (MT/s)	TBP	Bus interface
Radeon AI Pro R9600D (Navi 48)	Dec 11, 2025	RDNA 4 TSMC N4P	53.9 billion 357 mm^{2}	3072:192:96; 48:96:48 CU	1080; 2020	387.8	193.92	49.6	24.8	0.388	199	199	397	64 MB	32	640	GDDR6; 256-bit	20000	150 W	PCIe 5.0 ×16
Radeon AI Pro R9600 (Navi 48)	2026	RDNA 4 TSMC N4P	53.9 billion 357 mm^{2}	3072:192:96; 48:96:48 CU	1080; 2020	387.8	193.92	49.6	24.8	0.388	199	199	397	64 MB	32	640	GDDR6; 256-bit	20000	150 W	PCIe 5.0 ×16
Radeon AI Pro R9700S (Navi 48)	Dec 11, 2025	RDNA 4 TSMC N4P	53.9 billion 357 mm^{2}	4096:256:128; 64:128:64 CU	1660; 2920	425; 747.5	212.5; 373.76	54.4; 95.68	27.2; 47.84	0.425; 0.747	217.7; 383	217.7; 383	435.5; 766	64 MB	32	640	GDDR6; 256-bit	20000	300 W	PCIe 5.0 ×16
Radeon AI Pro R9700 (Navi 48)	Jul 23, 2025	RDNA 4 TSMC N4P	53.9 billion 357 mm^{2}	4096:256:128; 64:128:64 CU	1660; 2920	425; 747.5	212.5; 373.76	54.4; 95.68	27.2; 47.84	0.425; 0.747	217.7; 383	217.7; 383	435.5; 766	64 MB	32	640	GDDR6; 256-bit	20000	300 W	PCIe 5.0 ×16

== Mobile workstation GPUs ==
=== Mobility FireGL series ===
Model (Codename)	Launch	Architecture (Fab)	Core		Fillrate (Note: Texture fillrate is calculated as the number of Texture Mapping Units multiplied by the base (or boost) core clock speed.) (Note: Pixel fillrate is calculated as the number of Render Output Units multiplied by the base (or boost) core clock speed.)		Processing power (Note: Single precision performance is calculated from the base (or boost) core clock speed based on a FMA operation.) (GFLOPS)	Memory				Bus interface	Notes
Model (Codename)	Launch	Architecture (Fab)	Config	Clock (MHz)	Texture (GT/s)	Pixel (GP/s)	Processing power (GFLOPS)	Size (MB)	Bus type & width (bit)	Clock (MHz)	Band- width (GB/s)	Bus interface	Notes
Mobility FireGL 7800 (M7-GL)	2001-09-29	R100 (150 nm)	0:2:2:2 (Note: Vertex shader : Pixel shaders: Texture Mapping Units : Render Output Units)	280	0.56	0.56	Unknown	64	DDR; 128-bit	200	6.4	AGP 4x	27 Watt TDP
Mobility FireGL 9000 (M9-GL)	2002-01-01	R200 (150 nm)	1:4:4:4	250	1.0	1.0	Unknown	64	DDR; 128-bit	200	6.4	AGP 4x	
Mobility FireGL T2 (M10-GL)	2003-11-01	R300 (130 nm)	2:4:4:4	320	1.28	1.28	Unknown	128	DDR; 128-bit	200	6.5	AGP 4x	
Mobility FireGL T2e (M11-GL)	2004-08-01	R300 (130 nm)	2:4:4:4	450	1.8	1.8	Unknown	128	DDR; 128-bit	225	7.2	AGP 4x	
Mobility FireGL V3100 (M22-GL)	2004-06-01	R300 (110 nm)	2:4:4:4	350	1.4	1.4	Unknown	128	DDR; 128-bit	200	6.4	PCIe 1.0 x16	
Mobility FireGL V3200 (M24-GL)	2004-06-01	R300 (130 nm)	2:4:4:4	400	1.6	1.6	Unknown	128	DDR2; 128-bit	250	12.8	PCIe 1.0 x16	
Mobility FireGL V5000 (M26-GL)	2005-02-03	R420 (110 nm)	6:8:8:8	350	2.8	2.8	Unknown	128	GDDR3; 128-bit	425	13.6	PCIe 1.0 x16	
Mobility FireGL V5200 (M56-GL)	2006-02-01	R520 (90 nm)	5:12:12:12	425	5.1	5.1	Unknown	256	GDDR3; 128-bit	475	15.2	PCIe 1.0 x16	
Mobility FireGL V5250 (M66-GL)	2007-01-01	R520 (90 nm)	5:12:12:12	450	5.4	5.4	Unknown	256	GDDR3; 128-bit	350	11.2	PCIe 1.0 x16	
Mobility FireGL V5600 (M76-GL)	2007-05-14	TeraScale 1 (65 nm)	120:8:4 (Note: Unified Shaders : Texture Mapping Units : Render Output Units)	500	4.0	2.0	120.0	256	GDDR3; 128-bit	400	12.8	PCIe 2.0 x16	
Mobility FireGL V5700 (M86-GL)	2008-01-07	Terascale 2 (55 nm)	120:8:4	600	4.8	2.4	144	512	GDDR3; 128-bit	700	22.4	PCIe 2.0 x16	in Lenovo ThinkPad W500
Mobility FireGL V5725 (M86-GL)	2009-01-01	Terascale 2 (55 nm)	120:8:4	680	5.44	2.72	163.2	256	GDDR3; 128-bit	800	25.6	PCIe 2.0 x16	

=== FirePro Mobile series ===
Model (Codename)	Launch	Architecture (Fab)	Core		Fillrate (Note: Texture fillrate is calculated as the number of Texture Mapping Units multiplied by the base (or boost) core clock speed.) (Note: Pixel fillrate is calculated as the number of Render Output Units multiplied by the base (or boost) core clock speed.)		Processing power (Note: Single precision performance is calculated from the base (or boost) core clock speed based on a FMA operation.) (GFLOPS)	Memory				Bus interface	Notes
Model (Codename)	Launch	Architecture (Fab)	Config (Note: Unified Shaders : Texture Mapping Units : Render Output Units) (CU)	Clock (MHz)	Texture (GT/s)	Pixel (GP/s)	Processing power (GFLOPS)	Size (MB)	Bus type & width (bit)	Clock (MHz)	Band- width (GB/s)	Bus interface	Notes
FirePro M5725 (M96 GL)	2009-01-01	Terascale 2 (55 nm)	320:32:8 (3)	680	21.6	5.4	432	256	GDDR3; 128-bit	800	25.6	PCIe 2.0 x16	
FirePro M5800 (Madison XT GL)	2010-03-01	Terascale 2 (40 nm)	400:20:8 (5)	650	13	5.2	520	1024	GDDR5; 128-bit	800	25.6	PCIe 2.0 x16	HP EliteBook 8540w
FirePro M3900 (Seymour XT)	2011-04-13	Terascale 2 (40 nm)	160:8:4 (2)	700	6.0	3.0	224	1024	DDR3; 64-bit	900	14.4	PCIe 2.1 x16	HP Elitebook 8460w
FirePro M5950 (Whistler XT)	2011-01-04	Terascale 2 (40 nm)	480:24:8 (6)	725	17.4	5.8	696	1024	GDDR5; 128-bit	900	57.6	PCIe 2.1 x16	Dell Precision M4600, HP EliteBook 8560w
FirePro M7740 (M97XT GL)	2009-08-04	Terascale 1 (40 nm)	640:32:16 (8)	650	20.8	10.4	832	1024	GDDR5; 128-bit	1000	64	PCIe 2.0 x16	Dell Precision M6400 and M6500
FirePro M7820 (Juniper XT)	2010-05-01	Terascale 2 (40 nm)	800:40:16 (10)	700	28	11.2	1120	1024	GDDR5; 128-bit	1000	64	PCIe 2.0 x16	Dell Precision M6500, HP EliteBook 8740w
FirePro M8900 (Blackcomb XT GL)	2011-04-12	Terascale 2 (40 nm)	960:48:32 (12)	680	32.64	21.76	1310	2048	GDDR5; 256-bit	900	115.2	PCIe 2.1 x16	Dell Precision M6600
FirePro M2000 (Turks GL)	2012-07-01	Terascale 2 (40 nm)	480:24:8 (6)	500	12	4	480	1024	GDDR5; 64-bit	800	25.6	PCIe 2.1 x16	HP EliteBook 8470w
FirePro M4000 (Chelsea XT GL)	2012-06-27	GCN 1^{st} gen (28 nm)	512:32:16 (8)	600	19.2	9.6	614	2048	GDDR5; 128-bit	1000	51.2	PCIe 2.1 x16	HP EliteBook 8570w, HP EliteBook 8770w, Dell Precision M4700 (e.g. Consumer HD7700M Serie DevID 682D)
FirePro M6000 (Heathrow XT GL)	2012-06-27	GCN 1^{st} gen (28 nm)	640:40:16 (10)	800	30	12	960	2048	GDDR5; 128-bit	1000	64	PCIe 3.0 x16	Dell Precision M6700
FirePro M4100 (Mars)	2013-10-16	GCN 1^{st} gen (28 nm)	384:24:8 (6)	670	16.1	5.4	514	2048	GDDR5; 128-bit	1000	64	PCIe 3.0 x16	HP ZBook 14
FirePro W4170M (Mars XTX)	2014-04-28	GCN 1^{st} gen (28 nm)	384:24:8 (6)	825	19.8	6.6	691.2	2048	GDDR5; 128-bit	1125	72	PCIe 3.0 x16	Dell Precision M2800, HP ZBook 15u G2
FirePro W4190M (Opal)	2015-11-12	GCN 1^{st} gen (28 nm)	384:24:8 (6)	825	19.8	6.6	634	2048	GDDR5; 128-bit	900	72	PCIe 3.0 x16	HP ZBook 15u G3, MXM-3-A, OpenGL 4.6, OpenCL 2.0, TDP 25W
FirePro M5100 (Venus XT)	2013-10-16	GCN 1^{st} gen (28 nm)	640:40:16 (10)	775	31	12.4	992	2048	GDDR5; 128-bit	1125	72	PCIe 3.0 x16	Dell Precision M4800, Panasonic Toughbook 54, HP ZBook 15 G2 (e.g. R9 M200X Serie DevID 6821)
FirePro W5130M (Tropo LE)	2015-10-02	GCN 1^{st} gen (28 nm)	512:32:16 (8)	up to 925	28.8	14.4	up to 950	up to 2048	GDDR5; 128-bit	1000	64	PCIe 3.0 x16	Dell Precision 3510 (e.g. Consumer R7 M465X DevID 682B) MXM-3-A, DirectX 12.0 (feature level 11_1), OpenGL 4.6, OpenCL 2.0, Vulkan 1.0, TDP 35W
FirePro W5170M (Tropo XT)	2014-08-25	GCN 1^{st} gen (28 nm)	640:40:16 (10)	up to 925	36.0	14.4	up to 1180	up to 2048	GDDR5; 128-bit	1125	72	PCIe 3.0 x16	Dell Precision 7510, Dell Precision 7710, HP ZBook 15 G3 (e.g. Consumer R9 M375X DevID 6820 REV 083) MXM-3-A, DirectX 12.0 (feature level 11_1), OpenGL 4.6, OpenCL 2.0, Vulkan 1.0, TDP 45W
FirePro M6100 (Saturn XT GL)	2013-10-16	GCN 2^{nd} gen (28 nm)	768: 48:16 (12)	up to 1100	51.6	17.2	1651.2	2048	GDDR5; 128-bit	1375/1500	88/96	PCIe 3.0 x16	Dell Precision M6600 / M6800, HP Zbook 17 G2
FirePro W6150M (Saturn XT GL)	2015-11-12	GCN 2^{nd} gen (28 nm)	768:48:16 (12)	1075	51.6	17.2	1651	4096	GDDR5; 128-bit	1375	88	PCIe 3.0 x16	HP Zbook 17 G3, MXM-3-B, OpenGL 4.6, OpenCL 2.0, TDP 100W
FirePro W6170M (Saturn XT GL)	2014-08-25	GCN 2^{nd} gen (28 nm)	768:48:16 (12)	1075	51.6	17.2	1651	4096	GDDR5; 128-bit	1375	88	PCIe 3.0 x16	HP ZBook 17 G2
FirePro W7170M (Amethyst XT)	2015-10-02	GCN 3^{rd} gen (28 nm)	2048:128:32 (32)	723	92.5	23.1	2960	4096	GDDR5; 256-bit	1250	160	PCIe 3.0 x16	Dell Precision 7710, MXM-3-B, DirectX 12.0 (feature level 11_1), OpenGL 4.6, OpenCL 2.0, Vulkan 1.0, TDP 100W

=== Radeon Pro WX x100 Mobile series ===
- Half precision power (FP16) is equal to single precision power (FP32) in 4th GCN generation (in 5th Gen: half precision (FP16) = 2× SP (FP32))

Model (Code name)	Release date	Architecture & fab	Transistors & die size	Core		Fillrate (Note: Boost values (if available) are stated below the base value in italic.) (Note: Texture fillrate is calculated as the number of Texture Mapping Units (TMUs) multiplied by the base (or boost) core clock speed.) (Note: Pixel fillrate is calculated as the number of Render Output Units (ROPs) multiplied by the base (or boost) core clock speed.)		Processing power (Note: Precision performance is calculated from the base (or boost) core clock speed based on a FMA operation.) (GFLOPS)		Memory				TDP	Bus interface
Model (Code name)	Release date	Architecture & fab	Transistors & die size	Config (Note: Unified shaders : Texture mapping units : Render output units and Compute units (CU))	Clock (MHz)	Texture (GT/s)	Pixel (GP/s)	Single	Double	Size (GB)	Bandwidth (GB/s)	Bus type & width	Clock (MT/s)	TDP	Bus interface
Radeon Pro WX 2100 (Mobile) (Polaris 12)	Mar 1, 2017	GCN 4 Samsung/GloFo; 14LPP	2.2×10^{9} 103 mm^{2}	512:32:16; 8 CU	925; 1219	29.60; 39.01	14.80; 19.50	947.2; 1,250	59.20; 78.02	2	48	GDDR5; 64-bit	6000	35 W	PCIe 3.0 ×16
Radeon Pro WX 3100 (Mobile) (Polaris 12)	Mar 1, 2017	GCN 4 Samsung/GloFo; 14LPP	2.2×10^{9} 103 mm^{2}	512:32:16; 8 CU	925; 1219	29.60; 39.01	14.80; 19.50	947.2; 1,250	59.20; 78.02	4	96	GDDR5; 128-bit	6000	50 W	PCIe 3.0 ×16
Radeon Pro WX 4130 (Mobile) (Polaris 11)	Mar 1, 2017	GCN 4 Samsung/GloFo; 14LPP	3.0×10^{9} 123 mm^{2}	640:40:16; 10 CU	1002; 1053	40.08; 42.12	16.03; 16.85	1,282; 1,348	80.16; 84.24	4	96	GDDR5; 128-bit	6000	50 W	PCIe 3.0 ×16
Radeon Pro WX 4150 (Mobile) (Polaris 11)	Mar 1, 2017	GCN 4 Samsung/GloFo; 14LPP	3.0×10^{9} 123 mm^{2}	896:56:16; 14 CU	1002; 1053	56.11; 58.97	16.03; 16.85	1,796; 1,887	112.2; 117.9	4	96	GDDR5; 128-bit	6000	45-50 W	PCIe 3.0 ×16
Radeon Pro WX 4170 (Mobile) (Polaris 11)	Mar 1, 2017	GCN 4 Samsung/GloFo; 14LPP	3.0×10^{9} 123 mm^{2}	1024:64:16; 16 CU	1002; 1201	64.12; 76.86	16.03; 19.22	2,052; 2,460	128.3; 153.7	4	112	GDDR5; 128-bit	6000	50-60 W	PCIe 3.0 ×16
Radeon Pro WX 7100 (Mobile) (Polaris 10)	Mar 1, 2017	GCN 4 Samsung/GloFo; 14LPP	5.7×10^{9} 232 mm^{2}	2304:144:32; 36 CU	1188; 1243	171.1; 179.0	38.0; 39.78	5,474; 5,728	342.1; 358.0	8	160	GDDR5; 256-bit	5000	100-130 W	PCIe 3.0 ×16
Radeon Pro WX 7130 (Mobile) (Polaris 10)	Mar 1, 2017	GCN 4 Samsung/GloFo; 14LPP	5.7×10^{9} 232 mm^{2}	2304:144:32; 36 CU	1188; 1243	171.1; 179.0	38.0; 39.78	5,474; 5,728	342.1; 358.0	8	160	GDDR5; 256-bit	5000	100-130 W	PCIe 3.0 ×16

=== Radeon Pro 400 series ===
Model (Code name)	Release date	Architecture & fab	Transistors & die size	Core		Fillrate (Note: Boost values (if available) are stated below the base value in italic.) (Note: Texture fillrate is calculated as the number of Texture Mapping Units multiplied by the base (or boost) core clock speed.) (Note: Pixel fillrate is calculated as the number of Render Output Units multiplied by the base (or boost) core clock speed.)		Processing power (Note: Precision performance is calculated from the base (or boost) core clock speed based on a FMA operation.) (GFLOPS)			Memory				TDP	Bus interface
Model (Code name)	Release date	Architecture & fab	Transistors & die size	Config (Note: Unified shaders : Texture mapping units : Render output units and Compute units (CU))	Clock (MHz)	Texture (GT/s)	Pixel (GP/s)	Half	Single	Double	Size (GB)	Bandwidth (GB/s)	Bus type & width	Clock (MT/s)	TDP	Bus interface
Radeon Pro 450 (Polaris 11)	Oct 30, 2016	GCN 4 GloFo 14 nm	3.0×10^{9} 123 mm^{2}	640:40:16; 10 CU	800	32.00	12.80	1,024	1,024	64.00	2	80	GDDR5; 128-bit	5000	35 W	PCIe 3.0 ×8
Radeon Pro 455 (Polaris 11)	Oct 30, 2016	GCN 4 GloFo 14 nm	3.0×10^{9} 123 mm^{2}	768:48:16; 12 CU	855	41.04	13.68	1,313	1,313	82.08	2	80	GDDR5; 128-bit	5000	35 W	PCIe 3.0 ×8
Radeon Pro 460 (Polaris 11)	Oct 30, 2016	GCN 4 GloFo 14 nm	3.0×10^{9} 123 mm^{2}	1024:64:16; 16 CU	850; 907	54.40; 58.05	13.60; 14.51	1,741; 1,858	1,741; 1,858	108.8; 116.1	4	80	GDDR5; 128-bit	5000	35 W	PCIe 3.0 ×8

=== Radeon Pro 500 series ===
Model (Code name)	Release date	Architecture & fab	Transistors & die size	Core		Fillrate (Note: Boost values (if available) are stated below the base value in italic.) (Note: Texture fillrate is calculated as the number of Texture Mapping Units multiplied by the base (or boost) core clock speed.) (Note: Pixel fillrate is calculated as the number of Render Output Units multiplied by the base (or boost) core clock speed.)		Processing power (Note: Precision performance is calculated from the base (or boost) core clock speed based on a FMA operation.) (GFLOPS)			Memory				TDP	Bus interface
Model (Code name)	Release date	Architecture & fab	Transistors & die size	Config (Note: Unified shaders : Texture mapping units : Render output units and Compute units (CU))	Clock (MHz)	Texture (GT/s)	Pixel (GP/s)	Half	Single	Double	Size (GB)	Bandwidth (GB/s)	Bus type & width	Clock (MT/s)	TDP	Bus interface
Radeon Pro 555 (Polaris 21)	Jun 6, 2017	GCN 4 GloFo 14 nm	3.0×10^{9} 123 mm^{2}	768:48:16; 12 CU	850	40.80	13.60	1,306	1,306	81.60	2	81.60	GDDR5; 128-bit	5100	50 W	PCIe 3.0 ×16
Radeon Pro 555X (Polaris 21)	Jul 16, 2018	GCN 4 GloFo 14 nm	3.0×10^{9} 123 mm^{2}	768:48:16; 12 CU	907	43.54	14.51	1,393	1,393	87.07	4	94.08	GDDR5; 128-bit	5900	50 W	PCIe 3.0 ×16
Radeon Pro 560 (Polaris 21)	Jun 6, 2017	GCN 4 GloFo 14 nm	3.0×10^{9} 123 mm^{2}	1024:64:16; 16 CU	907	58.05	14.51	1,858	1,858	116.1	4	81.28	GDDR5; 128-bit	5100	50 W	PCIe 3.0 ×16
Radeon Pro 560X (Polaris 21)	Jul 16, 2018	GCN 4 GloFo 14 nm	3.0×10^{9} 123 mm^{2}	1024:64:16; 16 CU	1004	64.26	16.06	2,056	2,056	128.5	4	94.08	GDDR5; 128-bit	5900	75 W	PCIe 3.0 ×16
Radeon Pro 570 (Polaris 20)	Jun 6, 2017	GCN 4 GloFo 14 nm	5.7×10^{9} 232 mm^{2}	1792:112:32; 28 CU	1000; 1105	112.0; 123.8	32.00; 35.36	3,584; 3,960	3,584; 3,960	224.0; 247.5	4	217.0	GDDR5; 256-bit	6800	120 W	PCIe 3.0 ×16
Radeon Pro 570X (Polaris 20)	Mar 18, 2019	GCN 4 GloFo 14 nm	5.7×10^{9} 232 mm^{2}	1792:112:32; 28 CU	1000; 1105	112.0; 123.8	32.00; 35.36	3,584; 3,960	3,584; 3,960	224.0; 247.5	4	217.6	GDDR5; 256-bit	6800	150 W	PCIe 3.0 ×16
Radeon Pro 575 (Polaris 20)	Jun 6, 2017	GCN 4 GloFo 14 nm	5.7×10^{9} 232 mm^{2}	2048:128:32; 32 CU	1096	140.3	35.07	4,489	4,489	280.6	4	217.0	GDDR5; 256-bit	6800	120 W	PCIe 3.0 ×16
Radeon Pro 575X (Polaris 20)	Mar 18, 2019	GCN 4 GloFo 14 nm	5.7×10^{9} 232 mm^{2}	2048:128:32; 32 CU	1096	140.3	35.07	4,489	4,489	280.6	4	217.6	GDDR5; 256-bit	6800	150 W	PCIe 3.0 ×16
Radeon Pro 580 (Polaris 10)	Jun 6, 2017	GCN 4 GloFo 14 nm	5.7×10^{9} 232 mm^{2}	2304:144:32; 36 CU	1100; 1200	158.4; 172.8	35.2; 38.4	5,069; 5,530	5,069; 5,530	316.8; 345.6	8	217.0	GDDR5; 256-bit	6800	150 W	PCIe 3.0 ×16
Radeon Pro 580X (Polaris 10)	Mar 18, 2019	GCN 4 GloFo 14 nm	5.7×10^{9} 232 mm^{2}	2304:144:32; 36 CU	1100; 1200	158.4; 172.8	35.2; 38.4	5,069; 5,530	5,069; 5,530	316.8; 345.6	8	218.9	GDDR5; 256-bit	6800	185 W	PCIe 3.0 ×16

=== Radeon Pro WX x200 Mobile series ===
Model (Codename)	Release date	Architecture & Fab	Transistors & die size	Core		Fillrate (Note: Boost values (if available) are stated below the base value in italic.) (Note: Texture fillrate is calculated as the number of Texture Mapping Units multiplied by the base (or boost) core clock speed.) (Note: Pixel fillrate is calculated as the number of Render Output Units multiplied by the base (or boost) core clock speed.)		Processing power (Note: Precision performance is calculated from the base (or boost) core clock speed based on a FMA operation.) (GFLOPS)		Memory				TDP	Bus interface
Model (Codename)	Release date	Architecture & Fab	Transistors & die size	Config (Note: Unified Shaders : Texture Mapping Units : Render Output Units : Compute Units)	Clock (MHz)	Texture (GT/s)	Pixel (GP/s)	Single	Double	Bus type & width	Size (GB)	Clock (MT/s)	Bandwidth (GB/s)	TDP	Bus interface
Radeon Pro WX 3200 (Mobile) (Polaris 23 XT GLM)	March 1, 2017	GCN 4th gen GloFo 14 nm	2.2×10^{9} 103 mm^{2}	640:32:16; 10 CU	1082; 1295 ?	34.62; 41.44 ?	17.31; 20.72 ?	1,385; 1,658	86.56; 103.6	GDDR5; 128-bit	4	4000	64	65 W	PCIe 3.0 ×8

=== Radeon Pro Vega series ===
Model (Code name)	Release date	Architecture & fab	Transistors & die size	Core		Fillrate (Note: Boost values (if available) are stated below the base value in italic.) (Note: Texture fillrate is calculated as the number of Texture Mapping Units multiplied by the base (or boost) core clock speed.) (Note: Pixel fillrate is calculated as the number of Render Output Units multiplied by the base (or boost) core clock speed.)		Processing power (Note: Precision performance is calculated from the base (or boost) core clock speed based on a FMA operation.) (GFLOPS)			Memory				TDP	Bus interface
Model (Code name)	Release date	Architecture & fab	Transistors & die size	Config (Note: Unified shaders : Texture mapping units : Render output units and Compute units (CU))	Clock (MHz)	Texture (GT/s)	Pixel (GP/s)	Half	Single	Double	Size (GB)	Bandwidth (GB/s)	Bus type & width	Clock (MT/s)	TDP	Bus interface
Radeon Pro Vega 16 (Vega 12)	Nov 14, 2018	GCN 5 GloFo 14 nm	?	1024:64:32; 16 CU	815; 1190	52.16; 76.16	26.08; 38.08	3,338; 4,874	1,669; 2,437	104.3; 152.3	4	307.2	HBM2; 1024-bit	2400	50 W	PCIe 3.0 ×16
Radeon Pro Vega 20 (Vega 12)	Nov 14, 2018	GCN 5 GloFo 14 nm	?	1280:80:32; 20 CU	815; 1283	65.20; 102.6	26.08; 41.06	4,173; 6,569	2,086; 3,285	130.4; 205.3	4	189.4	HBM2; 1024-bit	1480	50 W	PCIe 3.0 ×16
Radeon Pro Vega 48 (Vega 10)	Mar 19, 2019	GCN 5 GloFo 14 nm	12.5×10^{9} 495 mm^{2}	3072:192:64; 48 CU	1200	230.4	76.80	14,746	7,373	460.8	8	402.4	HBM2; 2048-bit	1572	?	PCIe 3.0 ×16
Radeon Pro Vega 56 (Vega 10)	Aug 17, 2017	GCN 5 GloFo 14 nm	12.5×10^{9} 495 mm^{2}	3584:224:64; 56 CU	1138; 1250	254.9; 280.0	72.83; 80.00	16,314; 17,920	8,157; 8,960	509.8; 560.0	8	402.4	HBM2; 2048-bit	1572	120 W	PCIe 3.0 ×16
Radeon Pro Vega 64 (Vega 10)	Jun 17, 2017	GCN 5 GloFo 14 nm	12.5×10^{9} 495 mm^{2}	4096:256:64; 64 CU	1250; 1350	320.0; 345.6	80.00; 86.40	20,480; 22,118	10,240; 11,059	640.0; 691.2	16	402.4	HBM2; 2048-bit	1572	?	PCIe 3.0 ×16
Radeon Pro Vega 64X (Vega 10)	Mar 19, 2019	GCN 5 GloFo 14 nm	12.5×10^{9} 495 mm^{2}	4096:256:64; 64 CU	1250; 1468	320.0; 375.8	80.00; 93.95	20,480; 24,051	10,240; 12,026	640.0; 751.6	16	512.0	HBM2; 2048-bit	2000	?	PCIe 3.0 ×16

=== Radeon Pro 5000M series ===
Model (Code name)	Release date	Architecture & fab	Transistors die size	Core		Fillrate (Note: Boost values (if available) are stated below the base value in italic.) (Note: Texture fillrate is calculated as the number of Texture Mapping Units multiplied by the base (or boost) core clock speed.) (Note: Pixel fillrate is calculated as the number of Render Output Units multiplied by the base (or boost) core clock speed.)		Processing power (Note: Precision performance is calculated from the base (or boost) core clock speed based on a FMA operation.) (GFLOPS)			Memory				TDP	Bus interface
Model (Code name)	Release date	Architecture & fab	Transistors die size	Config (Note: Unified shaders : Texture mapping units : Render output units and Compute units (CU))	Clock (MHz)	Texture (GT/s)	Pixel (GP/s)	Half	Single	Double	Size (GB)	Bandwidth (GB/s)	Bus type & width	Clock (MT/s)	TDP	Bus interface
Radeon Pro 5300M (Navi 14)	Nov 13, 2019	RDNA; TSMC N7	6.4×10^{9} 158 mm^{2}	1280:80:32; 20 CU	1000; 1250	80.00; 100.0	32.00; 40.00	5,120; 6,400	2,560; 3,200	160.0; 200.0	4	192	GDDR6; 128-bit	12000	50 W	PCIe 4.0 ×8
Radeon Pro 5500M (Navi 14)	Nov 13, 2019	RDNA; TSMC N7	6.4×10^{9} 158 mm^{2}	1536:96:32; 24 CU	1000; 1300	96.00; 124.8	32.00; 41.60	6,144; 8,908	3,072; 4,454	192.0; 278.4	4; 8	192	GDDR6; 128-bit	12000	50 W	PCIe 4.0 ×8
Radeon Pro 5600M (Navi 12)	Jun 15, 2020	RDNA; TSMC N7	Unknown	2560:160:64; 40 CU	1000; 1035	160.0; 165.6	64.00; 66.24	10,240; 10,598	5,120; 5,299	320.0; 331.2	8	394	HBM2; 2048-bit	1540	50 W	PCIe 4.0 ×16

=== Radeon Pro W5000M series ===
Model (Code name)	Release date	Architecture & fab	Transistors & die size	Core		Fillrate (Note: Boost values (if available) are stated below the base value in italic.) (Note: Texture fillrate is calculated as the number of Texture Mapping Units multiplied by the base (or boost) core clock speed.) (Note: Pixel fillrate is calculated as the number of Render Output Units multiplied by the base (or boost) core clock speed.)		Processing power (Note: Precision performance is calculated from the base (or boost) core clock speed based on a FMA operation.) (GFLOPS)			Memory				TDP	Bus interface
Model (Code name)	Release date	Architecture & fab	Transistors & die size	Config (Note: Unified shaders : Texture mapping units : Render output units and Compute units (CU))	Clock (MHz)	Texture (GT/s)	Pixel (GP/s)	Half	Single	Double	Size (GB)	Bandwidth (GB/s)	Bus type & width	Clock (MT/s)	TDP	Bus interface
Radeon Pro W5500M (Navi 14)	Feb 10, 2020	RDNA; TSMC N7	6.4×10^{9} 158 mm^{2}	1408:88:32; 22 CU	1000; 1700	88.00; 149.6	32.00; 54.40	5,632; 9,574	2,816; 4,787	176.0; 299.2	4	224	GDDR6; 128-bit	14000	65-85 W	PCIe 4.0 ×8

=== Radeon Pro W6000M series ===
Model (Code name)	Release date	Architecture & fab	Transistors & die size	Core		Fillrate (Note: Boost values (if available) are stated below the base value in italic.) (Note: Texture fillrate is calculated as the number of Texture Mapping Units multiplied by the base (or boost) core clock speed.) (Note: Pixel fillrate is calculated as the number of Render Output Units multiplied by the base (or boost) core clock speed.)		Processing power (Note: Precision performance is calculated from the base (or boost) core clock speed based on a FMA operation.) (GFLOPS)			Infinity Cache	Memory				TDP	Bus interface
Model (Code name)	Release date	Architecture & fab	Transistors & die size	Config (Note: Unified shaders : Texture mapping units : Render output units : Ray accelerators and Compute units (CU))	Clock (MHz)	Texture (GT/s)	Pixel (GP/s)	Half	Single	Double	Infinity Cache	Size (GB)	Bandwidth (GB/s)	Bus type & width	Clock (MT/s)	TDP	Bus interface
Radeon Pro W6300M (Navi 24)	Jan 19, 2022	RDNA 2 TSMC N6	5.4×10^{9} 107 mm^{2}	768:48:32:12; 12 CU	2214	106.3	70.8	6,801	3,401	212.5	8 MB	2	64	GDDR6; 32-bit	14000	25 W	PCIe 4.0 ×4
Radeon Pro W6500M (Navi 24)	Jan 19, 2022	RDNA 2 TSMC N6	5.4×10^{9} 107 mm^{2}	1024:64:32:16; 16 CU	2588	165.6	82.8	10,478	5,239	327.4	16 MB	4	128	GDDR6; 64-bit	14000	35–50 W	PCIe 4.0 ×4
Radeon Pro W6600M (Navi 23)	Jun 8, 2021	RDNA 2 TSMC N7	11.06×10^{9} 237 mm^{2}	1792:112:64:28; 28 CU	2200; 2900	246.4; 324.8	140.8; 185.6	15,770; 20,787	7,885; 10,394	492.8; 649.6	32 MB	8	224	GDDR6; 128-bit	14000	65–90 W	PCIe 4.0 ×16

== Server GPUs ==
=== FireStream series ===
Model (Codename)	Launch	Architecture (Fab)	Bus interface	Stream processors	Clock rate		Memory				Processing power (Note: Precision performance is calculated from the base (or boost) core clock speed based on a FMA operation.) (GFLOPS)		TDP (Watts)
Model (Codename)	Launch	Architecture (Fab)	Bus interface	Stream processors	Core (MHz)	Memory (MHz)	Size (MB)	Type	Bus width (bit)	Bandwidth (GB/s)	Single	Double	TDP (Watts)
Stream Processor (R580)	2006	R500; 80 nm		240	600		1024	GDDR3	256	83.2	375	N/A	165
FireStream 9170 (RV670)	November 8, 2007	TeraScale 1; 55 nm	PCIe 2.0 x16	320	800	800	2048	GDDR3	256	51.2	512	102.4	105
FireStream 9250 (RV770)	June 16, 2008	TeraScale 1; 55 nm	PCIe 2.0 x16	800	625	993	1024	GDDR3	256	63.6	1000	200	150
FireStream 9270 (RV770)	November 13, 2008	TeraScale 1; 55 nm	PCIe 2.0 x16	800	750	850	2048	GDDR5	256	108.8	1200	240	160
FireStream 9350 (Cypress XT)	June 23, 2010	TeraScale 2; 40 nm	PCIe 2.1 x16	1440	700	1000	2048	GDDR5	256	128	2016	403.2	150
FireStream 9370 (Cypress XT)	June 23, 2010	TeraScale 2; 40 nm	PCIe 2.1 x16	1600	825	1150	4096	GDDR5	256	147.2	2640	528	225

=== FirePro Remote series ===
Model	Launch	Code name	Fab (nm)	Bus interface	Clock rate		Core config^{1}	Fillrate		Memory				Processing power (GFLOPS)		API compliance (version)			TDP (Watts)	Notes
Model	Launch	Code name	Fab (nm)	Bus interface	Core (MHz)	Memory (MHz)	Core config^{1}	Pixel (GP/s)	Texture (GT/s)	Size (MB)	Bandwidth (GB/s)	Bus type	Bus width (bit)	Single precision	Double precision	Direct3D	OpenGL	OpenCL	TDP (Watts)	Notes
FirePro RG220	May 2010	RV711	55	PCIe 2.0 ×16	500	800	80(16×5):8:4:1	2.0	4.0	512	12.8	GDDR3 for GPU, RDRAM for PCoIP	64	80	No	10.1	3.3	1.0	35	Dual Ethernet ports plus DMS-59 for dual DVI-D output (no VGA host output)
FirePro R5000	February 25, 2013	Pitcairn LE GL (GCN 1st gen)	28	PCIe 3.0 ×16	825	800	768:48:32:12	26.4	39.6	2048	102.4	GDDR5	256	1267.2	79.2	11.1	4.5	1.2	<150	Ethernet port plus 2× Mini DisplayPort with Tera2 PCoIP

^{1} Unified shaders : Texture mapping units : Render output units : compute units
^{2} The effective data transfer rate of GDDR5 is quadruple its nominal clock, instead of double as it is with other DDR memory.

=== FirePro Server series (S000x/Sxx 000) ===
- Vulkan 1.0 and OpenGL 4.5 possible for GCN with Driver Update FirePro equal to Radeon Crimson 16.3 or higher. OpenGL 4.5 was only in Windows available. Actual Linux Driver support OpenGL 4.5 and Vulkan 1.0, but only OpenCL 1.2 by AMDGPU Driver 16.60.
- Vulkan 1.1 possible for GCN with Radeon Pro Software 18.Q1.1 or higher. It might not fully apply to GCN 1.0 or 1.1 GPUs.

Model	Launch	Microarchitecture	Code name	Fab (nm)	Bus interface	Clock rate		Core config^{1}	Fillrate		Memory				Processing power (GFLOPS)		API compliance (version)				TDP (Watts)	Notes
Model	Launch	Microarchitecture	Code name	Fab (nm)	Bus interface	Core (MHz)	Memory (MHz)	Core config^{1}	Pixel (GP/s)	Texture (GT/s)	Size (GiB)	Bandwidth (GB/s)	Bus type	Bus width (bit)	Single precision	Double precision	DirectX	OpenGL	OpenCL	Vulkan	TDP (Watts)	Notes
FirePro S4000x	August 7, 2014	GCN 1st gen	Venus XT	28	PCIe 3.0 x16	950	1200	640:40:16:10	11.6	29	2	72	GDDR5	256	992	62	11.1 12.0	4.5	1.2	1.0	<45	Type A MXM form factor, no physical display outputs
FirePro S7000	August 27, 2012	GCN 1st gen	Pitcairn XT	28	PCIe 3.0 x16	950	1200	1280:80:32:20	30.4	76	4	153.6	GDDR5	256	2432	152	11.1 12.0	4.5	1.2	1.0	<150	1× DP
FirePro S7100X	May 25, 2016	GCN 3rd gen	Amethyst XT	28	PCIe 3.0 x16	723	1050	2048:128:32:32	23.14	92.5	8	160	GDDR5	256	2961	TBA	11.2 12.0	4.5	2.0	1.1	100	For blade servers, MXM Module 3.1
FirePro S7150	February 1, 2016	GCN 3rd gen	Tonga PRO GL	28	PCIe 3.0 x16	1050	1250	1792:112:32:28	33.6	117.6	8	160	GDDR5	256	3763	250	11.2 12.0	4.5	2.0	1.1	150	ECC RAM, two Slots
FirePro S7150 X2	February 1, 2016	GCN 3rd gen	2× Tonga PRO GL	28	PCIe 3.0 x16	1050	1250	2× 1792:112:32:28	33.6	117.6	16	2× 160	GDDR5	256	7540	500	11.2 12.0	4.5	2.0	1.1	265	ECC RAM, no physical display outputs
FirePro S9000	August 27, 2012	GCN 1st gen	Tahiti PRO GL	28	PCIe 3.0 x16	900	1375	1792:112:32:28	28.8	100.8	6	264	GDDR5	384	3225.6	806.4	11.1 12.0	4.5	1.2	1.0	<225	ECC RAM, 1× DisplayPort
FirePro S9050	August 6, 2014	GCN 1st gen	Tahiti PRO GL	28	PCIe 3.0 x16	900	1375	1792:112:32:28	28.8	100.8	12	264	GDDR5	384	3225.6	806.4	11.1 12.0	4.5	1.2	1.0	<225	ECC RAM, 1× DisplayPort
FirePro S9100	October 2, 2014	GCN 2nd gen	Hawaii Pro GL	28	PCIe 3.0 x16	824	1250	2560:160:64:40	52.74	131.8	12	320	GDDR5	512	4219	2109	11.1 12.0	4.5	2.0	1.0	<225	ECC RAM, no physical display outputs
FirePro S9150	August 6, 2014	GCN 2nd gen	Hawaii XT GL	28	PCIe 3.0 x16	900	1250	2816:176:64:44	57.6	158.4	16	320	GDDR5	512	5070	2530	11.2 12.0	4.5	2.0	1.0	<235	ECC RAM, no physical display outputs
FirePro S9170	July 8, 2015	GCN 2nd gen	Grenada XT GL	28	PCIe 3.0 x16	930	1375	2816:176:64:44	59.52	163.68	32	320	GDDR5	512	5240	2620	11.2 12.0	4.5	2.0	1.0	<275	ECC RAM, full throughput double precision, no physical display outputs
FirePro S9300 x2	March 31, 2016	GCN 3rd gen	2× Capsaicin XT	28	PCIe 3.0 x16	850	2× 500	2× 4096:256:64:64	54.4	217.6	2× 4	2× 512	HBM	2× 4096	13900	868	11.2 12.0	4.5	2.0	1.1	300	Non-ECC RAM, half-precision (FP16) support, no physical display outputs
FirePro S10000	November 12, 2012	GCN 1st gen	2× Zaphod (Tahiti Pro GL)	28	PCIe 3.0 x16	825	1250	2× 1792:112:32:28	52.8	184.8	2× 3	2× 240	GDDR5	384	5913.6	1478.4	11.1 12.0	4.5	1.2	1.0	<375	ECC RAM, 4x DP, 1x DVI-I
FirePro S10000 passive	November 12, 2012	GCN 1st gen	2× Tahiti PRO GL	28	PCIe 3.0 x16	825	1250	2× 1792:112:32:28	52.8	184.8	2× 3	2× 240	GDDR5	384	5913.6	1478.4	11.1 12.0	4.5	1.2	1.0	<375	ECC RAM, 1x Mini DP, 1x DVI-I

^{1} Unified shaders : Texture mapping units : Render output units: Compute units
^{2} The effective data transfer rate of GDDR5 is quadruple its nominal clock, instead of double as it is with other DDR memory.
^{3} OpenGL 4.4: support with AMD FirePro driver release 14.301.000 or later, in footnotes of specs

=== Radeon Sky series ===
Model	Launch	Code name	Fab (nm)	Bus interface	Clock rate		Core config^{1}	Fillrate		Memory				Processing power (GFLOPS)		API compliance (version)				TDP (Watts)	Notes
Model	Launch	Code name	Fab (nm)	Bus interface	Core (MHz)	Memory (MHz)	Core config^{1}	Pixel (GP/s)	Texture (GT/s)	Size (GiB)	Bandwidth (GB/s)	Bus type	Bus width (bit)	Single precision	Double precision	Direct3D	OpenGL	OpenCL	Vulkan	TDP (Watts)	Notes
Radeon Sky 500	April 2013	Pitcairn XT	28	PCIe 3.0 x16	950	1200	1280:80:32:20	30.4	76	4	153.6	GDDR5	256	2432	152	12.0	4.5	1.2	?	150	One DisplayPort
Radeon Sky 700	April 2013	Tahiti PRO	28	PCIe 3.0 x16	900	1375	1792:112:32:28	28.8	100.8	6	264	GDDR5	384	3225.6	806.4	12.0	4.5	1.2	?	225	One DisplayPort
Radeon Sky 900	April 2013	2× Tahiti PRO	28	PCIe 3.0 x16	825 950	1250	2× 1792:112:32:28	52.8	184.8	2× 3	2× 240	GDDR5	2x 384	5913.6	1478.4	12.0	4.5	1.2	?	300	4× Mini DisplayPort, 1× DVI-I

^{1} Unified shaders : Texture mapping units : Render output units : compute units
^{2} The effective data transfer rate of GDDR5 is quadruple its nominal clock, instead of double as it is with other DDR memory.

=== Radeon Pro V series ===
Model (Code name)	Release date	Architecture & fab	Transistors & die size	Core		Fillrate (Note: Boost values (if available) are stated below the base value in italic.) (Note: Texture fillrate is calculated as the number of Texture Mapping Units multiplied by the base (or boost) core clock speed.) (Note: Pixel fillrate is calculated as the number of Render Output Units multiplied by the base (or boost) core clock speed.)		Processing power (Note: Precision performance is calculated from the base (or boost) core clock speed based on a FMA operation.) (GFLOPS)			L3 cache	Memory				TDP	Bus interface	Graphic output ports
Model (Code name)	Release date	Architecture & fab	Transistors & die size	Config (Note: Unified shaders : Texture mapping units : Render output units : Ray accelerators and Compute units (CU))	Clock (MHz)	Texture (GT/s)	Pixel (GP/s)	Half	Single	Double	L3 cache	Size (GB)	Bandwidth (GB/s)	Bus type & width	Clock (MT/s)	TDP	Bus interface	Graphic output ports
Radeon Pro V320 (Vega 10)	Jun 29, 2017 (Custom SKU)	GCN 5 GF 14LPP	12.5×10^{9} 495 mm^{2}	4096:256:64:- 64 CU	852; 1000	218.1; 256	54.52; 64	13,959; 16,384	6,979; 8,192	436.2; 512	—	8 or 16	484	HBM2; 2048-bit	1890	230 W	PCIe 3.0 ×16	4× miniDP 1.4a
Radeon Pro V340 (Vega 10)	Aug 26, 2018	GCN 5 GF 14LPP	2× / 12.5×10^{9} 495 mm^{2}	2× / 3584:224:64:- 56 CU	852; 1500	2× / 190.8; 336	2× / 54.52; 96	2× / 12,214; 21,504	2× / 6,107; 10,752	2× / 381.7; 672	—	2× 16	2× 484	HBM2; 2× 2048-bit	1890	300 W	PCIe 3.0 ×16	1× miniDP 1.4a
Radeon Pro V520 (Navi 12)	Dec 1, 2020	RDNA; TSMC N7	Unknown	2304:144:64:- 36 CU	1000; 1600	144; 230.4	64; 102.4	9,216; 14,746	4,608; 7,373	288; 460.8	—	8	512	HBM2; 2048-bit	2000	225 W	PCIe 4.0 ×16	—N/a
Radeon Pro V620 (Navi 21)	Nov 4, 2021	RDNA 2 TSMC N7	26.8×10^{9} 520 mm^{2}	4608:288:128:72; 72 CU	1825; 2200	525.6; 633.6	233.6; 281.6	33,638; 40,550	16,819; 20,275	1,051; 1,267	128 MB	32	512	GDDR6; 256-bit	16000	300 W	PCIe 4.0 ×16	—N/a
Radeon Pro V710 (Navi 32)	Oct 3, 2024	RDNA 3 TSMC N5 (GCD); TSMC N6 (MCD)	28.1×10^{9} 384 mm^{2}	3456:216:96:54; 54 CU	1900; 2000	432	192	55,296	28,314	1,728	54 MB	28	448	GDDR6; 224-bit	16000	158 W	PCIe 4.0 ×16	—N/a

=== Radeon Instinct series ===
AMD Radeon Instinct GPUs (has render output, no matrix units)
Model (Code name)	Launch	Architecture & fab	LLVM target	Transistors & die size	Core		Fillrate (Note: Boost values (if available) are stated below the base value in italic.) (Note: Texture fillrate is calculated as the number of texture mapping units multiplied by the base (or boost) core clock speed.) (Note: Pixel fillrate is calculated as the number of render output units multiplied by the base (or boost) core clock speed.)		Vector TFLOPS (Note: Precision performance is calculated from the base (or boost) core clock speed based on a FMA operation.)			Memory				TBP	Bus interface
Model (Code name)	Launch	Architecture & fab	LLVM target	Transistors & die size	Config (Note: Unified shaders : Texture mapping units : Render output units and Compute units (CU))	Clock (MHz)	Texture (GT/s)	Pixel (GP/s)	FP16	FP32	FP64	Size (GB)	Bus type & width	Bandwidth (GB/s)	Clock (MT/s)	TBP	Bus interface
Radeon Instinct MI6 (Polaris 10)	Jun 20, 2017	GCN 4 GloFo 14LP	gfx803	5.7×10^{9} 232 mm^{2}	2304:144:32; 36 CU	1120; 1233	161.3; 177.6	35.84; 39.46	5.161; 5.682	5.161; 5.682	0.323; 0.355	16	GDDR5; 256-bit	224	7000	150 W	PCIe 3.0 ×16
Radeon Instinct MI8 (Fiji)	Jun 20, 2017	GCN 3 TSMC 28 nm	gfx803	8.9×10^{9} 596 mm^{2}	4096:256:64; 64 CU	1000	256.0	64.00	8.192	8.192	0.512	4	HBM; 4096-bit	512	1000	175 W	PCIe 3.0 ×16
Radeon Instinct MI25 (Vega 10)	Jun 20, 2017	GCN 5 GloFo 14LP	gfx900	12.5×10^{9} 510 mm^{2}	4096:256:64; 64 CU	1400; 1500	358.4; 384.0	89.60; 96.00	22.94; 24.58	11.47; 12.29	0.717; 0.768	16	HBM2; 2048-bit	484	1890	300 W	PCIe 3.0 ×16
Radeon Instinct MI50 (Vega 20)	Nov 18, 2018	GCN 5 TSMC N7	gfx906	13.2×10^{9} 331 mm^{2}	3840:240:64; 60 CU	1450; 1725	348.0; 414.0	92.80; 110.4	22.27; 26.50	11.14; 13.25	5.568; 6.624	16; 32	HBM2; 4096-bit	1024	2000	300 W	PCIe 4.0 ×16
Radeon Instinct MI60 (Vega 20)	Nov 18, 2018	GCN 5 TSMC N7	gfx906	13.2×10^{9} 331 mm^{2}	4096:256:64; 64 CU	1500; 1800	384.0; 460.8	96.00; 115.2	24.58; 29.49	12.29; 14.75	6.144; 7.373	32	HBM2; 4096-bit	1024	2000	300 W	PCIe 4.0 ×16

AMD Instinct GPUs (has matrix units, no render output)
Model (Code name)	Launch	Architecture & fab	LLVM target	Transistors & die size	Core		Vector TFLOPS				Matrix speedup (Note: The matrix unit exists in addition to the main vector (SIMD) processing unit to accelerate matrix-multiplication operations common in machine learning applications. It is able to optimize the multiplication of common data types, resulting in a integer-multiple (typically 2×) increase in TFLOPS. Since CDNA3 it is also able to use structured sparsity regularization for a 2× increase in TFLOPS for all data types. In CDNA4 the speedup has been removed for FP32 and FP64, instead focusing the unit on speedups for low precision (INT8, MXFP4/6/8, OCP-FP8, FP16, BF16).)			Memory				TBP	Bus interface
Model (Code name)	Launch	Architecture & fab	LLVM target	Transistors & die size	Config	Clock (MHz)	INT8 (Note: CDNA3 and later supports packed FP8 (E5M2, E4M3) at the same level of performance.)	FP16 (Note: CDNA supports BF16 at half the performance as FP16. CDNA2 and later supports BF16 at the same performance level as FP16. CDNA3 and later supports TF32 at the same performance level as FP16.)	FP32	FP64	FP32	FP64	S.Sparse	Size (GB)	Bus type & width	Bandwidth (GB/s)	Clock (MT/s)	TBP	Bus interface
AMD Instinct MI100 (Arcturus)	Nov 16, 2020	CDNA 1 TSMC N7	gfx908	25.6×10^{9} 750 mm^{2}	7680:480:- 120 CU	1000; 1502	122.9; 184.6	122.9; 184.6	15.36; 23.07	7.680; 11.54	2×	2×	1×	32	HBM2; 4096-bit	1228.8	2400	300 W	PCIe 4.0 ×16
AMD Instinct MI210 (Aldebaran)	Mar 22, 2022	CDNA 2 TSMC N6	gfx90a	28 × 10^{9} ~770 mm^{2}	6656:416:- 104 CU (1 × GCD) (Note: GCD Refers to a Graphics Compute Die. Each GCD is a different piece of silicon. The same applies to XCDs and CCDs.)	1000; 1700	106.5; 181.0	106.5; 181.0	13.31; 22.63	13.31; 22.63	2×	2×	1×	64	HBM2E; 4096-bit	1638.4	3200	300 W	PCIe 4.0 ×16
AMD Instinct MI250 (Aldebaran)	Nov 8, 2021	CDNA 2 TSMC N6	gfx90a	58 × 10^{9} 1540 mm^{2}	13312:832:- 208 CU (2 × GCD)	1000; 1700	213.0; 362.1	213.0; 362.1	26.62; 45.26	26.62; 45.26	2×	2×	1×	2 × 64	HBM2E; 2 × 4096-bit (Note: CDNA 2.0 Based cards adopt a design using two dies on the same package.They are linked with 400GB/s Bidirectional Infinity Fabric link, The dies are addressed as individual GPUs by the host system.)	2 × 1638.4	3200	500 W 560 W (Peak)	PCIe 4.0 ×16
AMD Instinct MI250X (Aldebaran)	Nov 8, 2021	CDNA 2 TSMC N6	gfx90a	58 × 10^{9} 1540 mm^{2}	14080:880:- 220 CU (2 × GCD)	1000; 1700	225.3; 383.0	225.3; 383.0	28.16; 47.87	28.16; 47.87	2×	2×	1×	2 × 64	HBM2E; 2 × 4096-bit	2 × 1638.4	3200	500 W 560 W (Peak)	PCIe 4.0 ×16
AMD Instinct MI300A (Antares)	Dec 6, 2023	CDNA 3 TSMC N5 & N6	gfx942	146 × 10^{9} 1017 mm^{2}	14592:912:- 228 CU (6 × XCD) 24 Zen 4 x86 cores (3 × CCD)	2100	1961.2	980.6	122.6	61.3	1×	1×	2×	128	HBM3; 8192-bit	5300	5200	550 W 760 W (Liquid Cooling)	PCIe 5.0 ×16
AMD Instinct MI300X (Aqua Vanjaram)	Dec 6, 2023	CDNA 3 TSMC N5 & N6	gfx942	153 × 10^{9} 1017 mm^{2}	19456:1216:- 304 CU (8 × XCD)	2100	2614.9	1307.4	163.4	81.7	1×	1×	2×	192	HBM3; 8192-bit	5300	5200	750 W	PCIe 5.0 ×16
AMD Instinct MI325X (Aqua Vanjaram)	Dec 6, 2023	CDNA 3 TSMC N5 & N6	gfx942	153 × 10^{9} 1017 mm^{2}	19456:1216:- 304 CU (8 × XCD)	2100	2614.9	1307.4	163.4	81.7	1×	1×	2×	256	HBM3; 8192-bit	6000	6000	1000 W	PCIe 5.0 ×16
AMD Instinct MI350P	May 7, 2026	CDNA 4 TSMC N3 & N6	gfx950	unknown	8192:512:- 128 CU (4 × XCD)	2200	2300 (Note: Matrix only)	72	72	36	1×	1×	2×	144	HBM3e; 4096-bit	8000	8000	600 W	PCIe 5.0 ×16
AMD Instinct MI350X	Jun 12, 2025	CDNA 4 TSMC N3 & N6	gfx950	185 × 10^{9} 1017 mm^{2}	16384:1024:- 256 CU (8 × XCD)	2200	4600	144.2	144.2	72.1	1×	1×	2×	288	HBM3e; 8192-bit	8000	8000	1000 W	PCIe 5.0 ×16 (OAM)
AMD Instinct MI355X	Jun 12, 2025	CDNA 4 TSMC N3 & N6	gfx950	185 × 10^{9} 1017 mm^{2}	16384:1024:- 256 CU (8 × XCD)	2400	5000	157.3	157.3	78.6	1×	1×	2×	288	HBM3e; 8192-bit	8000	8000	1400 W	PCIe 5.0 ×16 (OAM)

== Embedded GPUs ==
Model (Code name)	Launch	Architecture & fab	Bus interface	Clock rate		Core config^{1},^{2}	Fillrate		Memory				Processing power (GFLOPS)		API compliance (version)				TDP (Watts)	Notes
Model (Code name)	Launch	Architecture & fab	Bus interface	Core (MHz)	Memory (MHz)	Core config^{1},^{2}	Pixel (GP/s)	Texture (GT/s)	Size	Bandwidth (GB/s)	Type	Bus width (bit)	Single	Double	Direct3D	OpenGL	OpenCL	Vulkan	TDP (Watts)	Notes
Radeon E2400 (RV610)	Jun 2007	Terascale 1 TSMC 65 nm	PCIe 1.1 ×16	600	700	40:4:4	2.40	2.40	128 MB; 256 MB	11.2	GDDR3	64	48	—N/a	10.0	3.3	—N/a	—N/a	7–13	Form factor: PCIe or MXM-II; 2× DVI
Radeon E4690 (RV730)	Jun 2009	Terascale 1 TSMC 55 nm	PCIe 2.0 ×16	600	700	320:32:8	4.80	19.20	512 MB	22.4	GDDR3	128	384	—N/a	10.1	3.3	1.0	—N/a	8-25	Form factor: PCIe or MXM (MXM-II or MXM 3.0 Type A); 2× DVI
Radeon E6460 (Caicos)	Apr 2011	Terascale 2 TSMC 40 nm	PCIe 2.1 ×16	600	800	160:8:4:2	2.40	4.80	512 MB	25.6	GDDR5	64	192	—N/a	11.2	4.1 (up to 4.4)	1.1 (1.2)	—N/a	19–21	PCIe (4× miniDP/DVI or 2× DVI and DP)
Radeon E6465 (Caicos)	Sep 2015	Terascale 2 TSMC 40 nm	PCIe 2.1 ×16	600	800	160:8:4:2	2.40	4.80	2 GB	25.6	GDDR5	64	192	—N/a	11.2	4.1 (up to 4.4)	1.1 (1.2)	—N/a	20	PCIe (4× miniDP or 2× DP), or MXM Type A (4× DP/HDMI/DVI)
Radeon E6760 (Turks)	May 2011	Terascale 2 TSMC 40 nm	PCIe 2.1 ×16	600	800	480:24:8:6	4.80	14.40	1 GB	51.2	GDDR5	128	576	—N/a	11.2	4.1 (up to 4.4)	1.1 (1.2)	—N/a	37–42	
Radeon E8860 (Venus)	Jan 2014	GCN 1 TSMC 28 nm	PCIe 3.0 ×16	625	1125	640:40:16; 10 CU	10.00	25.00	2 GB	72	GDDR5	128	768?	48?	12.0	4.5 (4.6)	1.2 (2.1)	1.0 (1.2)	37	PCIe, MXM Type A, or MCM; with or w/o fan; miniDP, DVI+miniDP, or DP/HDMI/DVI
Radeon E8870 (Saturn)	Sep 2015	GCN 2 TSMC 28 nm	PCIe 3.0 ×16	1000	1500	768:48:16; 12 CU	16.00	48.00	4 GB	96	GDDR5	128	1536	96.00	12.0	4.5 (4.6)	2.0 (2.1)	1.0 (1.2)	75	PCIe (4× DP) or MXM Type B (6× DP/HDMI/DVI)
Radeon E8950 (Amethyst)	Sep 2015	GCN 3 TSMC 28 nm	MXM-B 3.0	735	1500	2048:128:32; 32 CU	23.52	94.08	8 GB	192	GDDR5	256	3011	188.16	12.0	4.5 (4.6)	2.0 (2.1)	1.0 (1.2)	95	Form factor: MXM Type B 3.0
Radeon E9171 (Polaris12)	Oct 2017	GCN 4 GloFo 14 nm	PCIe 3.0 ×8	1124 or 1219	1500	512:32:16; 8 CU	17.98; 19.50	35.97; 39.01	4 GB	96	GDDR5	128	1150; 1248	71.94; 78.02	12.0	4.5 (4.6)	2.0 (2.1)	1.0 (1.2)	35	5× miniDP or 2× miniDP+DP (PCIe); 5× DP/HDMI/DVI (on MXM Type A and MCM)
Radeon E9172 (Polaris12)	Oct 2017	GCN 4 GloFo 14 nm	PCIe 3.0 ×8	1124 or 1219	1500	512:32:16; 8 CU	17.98; 19.50	35.97; 39.01	2 GB	48	GDDR5	64	1150; 1248	71.94; 78.02	12.0	4.5 (4.6)	2.0 (2.1)	1.0 (1.2)	35	5× miniDP or 2× miniDP+DP (PCIe); 5× DP/HDMI/DVI (on MXM Type A and MCM)
Radeon E9173 (Polaris12)	Oct 2017	GCN 4 GloFo 14 nm	PCIe 3.0 ×8	1124 or 1219	1500	512:32:16; 8 CU	17.98; 19.50	35.97; 39.01	2 GB	48	GDDR5	64	1150; 1248	71.94; 78.02	12.0	4.5 (4.6)	2.0 (2.1)	1.0 (1.2)	35	5× miniDP or 2× miniDP+DP (PCIe); 5× DP/HDMI/DVI (on MXM Type A and MCM)
Radeon E9174 (Polaris12)	Oct 2017	GCN 4 GloFo 14 nm	PCIe 3.0 ×8	1124 or 1219	1500	512:32:16; 8 CU	17.98; 19.50	35.97; 39.01	4 GB	96	GDDR5	128	1150; 1248	71.94; 78.02	12.0	4.5 (4.6)	2.0 (2.1)	1.0 (1.2)	50	5× miniDP or 2× miniDP+DP (PCIe); 5× DP/HDMI/DVI (on MXM Type A and MCM)
Radeon E9175 (Polaris12)	Oct 2017	GCN 4 GloFo 14 nm	PCIe 3.0 ×8	1124 or 1219	1500	512:32:16; 8 CU	17.98; 19.50	35.97; 39.01	4 GB	96	GDDR5	128	1150; 1248	71.94; 78.02	12.0	4.5 (4.6)	2.0 (2.1)	1.0 (1.2)	50	5× miniDP or 2× miniDP+DP (PCIe); 5× DP/HDMI/DVI (on MXM Type A and MCM)
Radeon E9260 (Polaris11)	Sep 2016	GCN 4 GloFo 14 nm	PCIe 3.0 ×8		1750	896:48:16; 14 CU			4 GB	112	GDDR5	128	2500		12.0	4.5 (4.6)	2.0 (2.1)	1.0 (1.2)	50–80	PCIe (4× miniDP) or MXM Type A (5× DP/HDMI/DVI)
Radeon E9390 (Polaris10)	Oct 2019	GCN 4 GloFo 14 nm	PCIe 3.0 ×16	1086	1250	1792:112:32; 28 CU			8 GB	160	GDDR5	256	3892	243.26	12.0	4.5 (4.6)	2.0 (2.1)	1.0 (1.2)	75	4× DisplayPort
Radeon E9550 (Polaris10)	Sep 2016	GCN 4 GloFo 14 nm	PCIe 3.0 ×16	1243	1250	2304:144:32; 36 CU			8 GB	160	GDDR5	256	5728	357.98	12.0	4.5 (4.6)	2.0 (2.1)	1.0 (1.2)	95	MXM Type B 6× DP/HDMI
Radeon E9560 (Polaris10)	Oct 2019	GCN 4 GloFo 14 nm	PCIe 3.0 ×16	1243	1750	2304:144:32; 36 CU			8 GB	224	GDDR5	256	5728	357.98	12.0	4.5 (4.6)	2.0 (2.1)	1.0 (1.2)	130	4× DisplayPort
Radeon E9565 (Polaris10)	Sep 2020	GCN 4 GloFo 14 nm	PCIe 3.0 ×16	1243	1750	2304:144:32; 36 CU			16 GB	224	GDDR5	256	5728	357.98	12.0	4.5 (4.6)	2.0 (2.1)	1.0 (1.2)	135	6× miniDP

^{1} Unified shaders : Texture mapping units : Render output units
^{2} CU = Compute units
^{3} The effective data transfer rate of GDDR5 is quadruple its nominal clock, instead of double as it is with other DDR memory.

== Console GPUs ==
Code name (console model)	Launch	GPU code name and/or architecture	Fab (nm)	Transistors (million)	Core config^{1},^{2},^{3}	Core clock (MHz)	Fillrate				Ray-tracing performance		ML Performance		Memory					Bus interface	API compliance (version)			Processing power (GFLOPS)	Architecture features
Code name (console model)	Launch	GPU code name and/or architecture	Fab (nm)	Transistors (million)	Core config^{1},^{2},^{3}	Core clock (MHz)	MOperations/s	MPixels/s	MTexels/s	MTri/s	GRays/s (triangles)	GRays/s (voxels or boxes)	TOPS (INT8)	TOPS (INT4)	Size (MiB)	Clock (MHz)	RAM type	Bus width (bit)	Bandwidth (GB/s)	Bus interface	Direct3D	OpenGL	Other	Processing power (GFLOPS)	Architecture features
Project Dolphin (GameCube)	September 14, 2001	Flipper	NEC 180 nm	51 (GPU + eDRAM)	4:1:4:4	162	7,500	648	648	60	-	-	-	-	24 internal 16 shared 3 eDRAM	324; 81; 162	1T-SRAM; SDRAM eDRAM	64; 8; 384/512	3.2; 1.6; 7.8/10.4	Integrated	No	Unknown	GX	7.5	Fixed-function T&L, TEV register combiner
Xenon (Xbox 360)	November 22, 2005	Xenos GPU (R400)	TSMC 90 nm 65 nm 45 nm	232 (GPU) 105 (eDRAM)	240:16:8 eDRAM (192 parallel pixel processors)	500	240,000	4000 eDRAM (16000 with 4x MSAA)	8000	500	-	-	-	-	512 (shared); 10 eDRAM	700; 500	GDDR3 eDRAM	128	22.4; 32 (GPU to daughter die); 256 (Daughter die ROP to eDRAM)	Integrated	9.0c+	No	Unknown	240	Surface tessellation
Revolution (Wii)	November 19, 2006	Hollywood	NEC 90 nm	107 (GPU + eDRAM)	4:1:4:4	243	11,250	972	972	70	-	-	-	-	24 internal 64 shared 3 eDRAM	486; 486; 243	1T-SRAM; GDDR3 eDRAM	64; 64; 384/512	3.88; 3.88; 11.2/15.6	Integrated	No	Unknown	GX	11.25	Fixed-function T&L, TEV register combiner
Project Café (Wii U)	November 18, 2012	Latte^{4} GPU TeraScale (HD 4000 based)	Renesas 45 nm	880 GPU + eDRAM	160:16:8	550	176,000	4400	8800	550	-	-	-	-	2048 (shared); 32 eDRAM, 1024-bit wide	800 (1600 effective); 550	DDR3 eDRAM	64; 1024	12.8; 70.4	Integrated	No	Unknown	GX2	176	Fixed-function T&L, TEV register combiner, Interpolation Units for TMU assist
Durango (Xbox One)	November 22, 2013	GCN 2	TSMC 28 nm (One S) 16 nm	4,800 GPU + eSRAM GPU probably ~2,000	768:48:16	853, (One S) 914	1,310,208, (One S) 1,403,904	13,648, (One S) 14,624	40,944, (One S) 43,872	1300	-	-	-	-	8192 (shared); 32 eSRAM	1066.5 (2133 effective); 1706 (3412 effective)	DDR3 eSRAM		68.3; 218, 219 (One S)	Integrated	11.2; 12	No	Mantle technically possible	1310.2, (One S) 1403.9	Tiled resources, (One S) Upscaled 4K HDR support
Liverpool (PlayStation 4)	November 15, 2013	GCN 2	TSMC 28 nm 16 nm	probably ~2,800	1152:72:32	800	1,843,200	25,600	57,600	1707	-	-	-	-	8192 (shared)	1375 (5500 effective)	GDDR5	256	176	Integrated	No	4.2	GNM, GNMX, PlayStation Shader Language, Mantle technically possible	1843.2	HDR possible (only 2K)
Neo (PlayStation 4 Pro)	November 10, 2016	GCN 4	TSMC 16 nm	5,700	2304:144:32	911	4,197,888	29,152	131,200	3078	-	-	-	-	8192 (shared)	1700 (6800 effective)	GDDR5	256	217.6	Integrated	No	4.2 (4.5)	GNM, GNMX, PlayStation Shader Language, Mantle technically possible	4197.8	4K HDR possible, fully compatible PS4 mode with reduced power consumption
Scorpio Engine (Xbox One X)	November 7, 2017	GCN 4	TSMC 16 nm	6,600	2560:160:32	1172	6,000,640	37,504	187,520	4400	-	-	-	-	12288 (shared)	1700 (6800 effective)	GDDR5	384	326.4	Integrated	11.2; 12	No	Unknown	6000.6	4K HDR support, supersampling
Lockhart (Xbox Series S)	November 10, 2020	RDNA 2	TSMC 7 nm / 6 nm	5,900	1280:80:32:20	1565	FP32: 4,006,400 FP16: 8,012,800	50,080	125,200	2400	-	-	-	-	8192 (GPU) + 2048 (shared)	1750 (14000 effective)	GDDR6	128	224	Integrated	12U	No	Vulkan 1.3	FP32: 4006 FP16: 8013	DirectX raytracing, FidelityFX Super Resolution - FSR, FSR 2, FSR 3, DirectML, 4K HDR support, variable refresh rate, 120 Hz support
Anaconda (Xbox Series X)	November 10, 2020	RDNA 2	TSMC 7 nm / 6 nm	15,300	3328:208:64:52	1825	FP32: 12,147,200 FP16: 24,294,400	116,800	379,600	7300	94.9	379.6	48.5/97 (2:1 sparse	97/194 (2:1 sparse	10240 (GPU) + 6124 (shared)	1750 (14000 effective)	GDDR6	320	560	Integrated	12U	No	Vulkan 1.3	FP32: 12147.2 FP16: 24294.4	DirectX raytracing, FidelityFX Super Resolution - FSR, FSR 2, FSR 3, DirectML, 8K HDR support, variable refresh rate, 120 Hz support
Oberon (PlayStation 5)	November 12, 2020	RDNA 2	TSMC 7 nm / 6 nm	probably 10,600	2304:144:64:36	~2233 (Boost)	FP32: ~10,289,664 (Boost) FP16: 20,579,328 (Boost)	142,912 (Boost)	321,552 (Boost)	6400 (Boost)	-	-	-	-	16384 (shared)	1750 (14000 effective)	GDDR6	256	448	Integrated	No	4.6	Vulkan 1.3	FP32: 10289.6 (Boost) FP16: 20579.2 (Boost)	8K HDR support, 120 Hz support, FidelityFX Super Resolution (FSR), raytracing
Aerith (Steam Deck)	February 2022	RDNA 2	TSMC 7 nm / 6 nm	probably ~2,400	512:32:16:8	~1000/~1600 (Boost)	FP32: ~1.024.000/ ~1,638,400 (Boost) FP16: ~2,048,000/ ~3,276,800 (Boost)	16,000/ 25,600 (Boost)	32,000/ 51,200 (Boost)	644/ 1020 (Boost)	8/ 12.8 (Boost)	36/ 51.2 (Boost)	-	-	16384 (shared)	2750 (5500 effective)	LPDDR5	128	88	Integrated	No	4.6	Vulkan 1.3	FP32: 1024/ 1638.4 (Boost) FP16: 2048/ 3276.8 (Boost)	raytracing, FidelityFX Super Resolution (FSR), 8k resolution at 60 Hz or 4k resolution at 120 Hz (dock mode)
Radeon 740M - Phoenix (ROG Ally)	2023	RDNA 3	TSMC 4 nm	~25,000	256:16:8:4	2500 (Boost)	FP32: 2,560,000 (Boost) (dual-issue shader ALUs - Resulting in half of this value.)^{5} FP16: 5,120,000 (Boost) (dual-issue shader ALUs - Resulting in half of this value.)^{5}	20,000 (Boost)	40,000 (Boost)	~750	~10 (Boost)	~40 (Boost)	-	-	16384 (shared)	3200 (6400 effective)	LPDDR5	128	102.4	Integrated	12U	4.6	Vulkan 1.3	FP32: 2560 (Boost) (dual-issue shader ALUs)^{5} FP16: 5120 (Boost) (dual-issue shader ALUs)^{5}	raytracing, FidelityFX Super Resolution (FSR 1/2/3) DirectML
Radeon 780M - Phoenix (ROG Ally Extreme)	2023	RDNA 3	TSMC 4 nm	~25,000	768:48:32:12	2700 (Boost)	FP32: 8,294,000 (Boost) (dual-issue shader ALU - Resulting in half of this value.s)^{5} FP16: 16,590,000 (Boost) (dual-issue shader ALUs - Resulting in half of this value.)^{5}	86,400 (Boost)	129,600 (Boost)	~2300	~30 (Boost)	~120 (Boost)	-	-	16384 (shared)	3200 (6400 effective)	LPDDR5	128	102.4	Integrated	12U	4.6	Vulkan 1.3	FP32: 8294 (Boost) (dual-issue shader ALUs)^{5} FP16: 16590 (Boost) (dual-issue shader ALUs)^{5}	raytracing, FidelityFX Super Resolution (FSR 1/2/3) DirectML
Viola (PlayStation 5 Pro)	November 7, 2024	RDNA 3	TSMC 4 nm	~21000	3840:240:64:60	2170 (Boost)	FP32: 33,331,200 (Boost) (dual-issue shader ALUs - Resulting in half of this value.)^{5} FP16: 66,662,400 (Boost) (dual-issue shader ALUs - Resulting in half of this value.)^{5}	138,880 (Boost)	520,800 (Boost)	-	-	-	150/300 (2:1 sparse (Boost)	-	16384 (shared) 2048	2250 (18000 effective)	GDDR6 DDR5	256	576	Integrated	No	4.6	Vulkan 1.3	FP32: 16665.6 (Boost) FP16: 33331.2 (Boost)	8K HDR support, 120 Hz support, FidelityFX Super Resolution (FSR), raytracing, PlayStation Spectral Super Resolution (PSSR)
Code Name (Console Model)	Launch	GPU Code Name and/or Architecture	Fab (nm)	Transistors (million)	Core config^{1},^{2},^{3}	Core clock (MHz)	Million Operations/s	Million Pixels/a	MTexels/s	MTri/s	GRays/s (triangles)	GRays/s (voxels or boxes)	TOPS (INT8)	TOPS (INT4)	Size (MiB)	Clock (MHz)	RAM type	Bus width (bit)	Bandwidth (GB/s)	Bus interface	Direct3D	OpenGL	Other	Processing power (GFLOPS)	Architecture features
Code Name (Console Model)	Launch	GPU Code Name and/or Architecture	Fab (nm)	Transistors (million)	Core config^{1},^{2},^{3}	Core clock (MHz)	Fillrate				Ray-tracing Performance		ML Performance		Memory					Bus interface	API compliance (version)			Processing power (GFLOPS)	Architecture features

^{1} Pixel shaders : Vertex shaders : Texture mapping units : Render output units
^{2} Unified shaders : Texture mapping units : Render output units
^{3} Unified shaders : Texture mapping units : Render output units : RT Cores
^{4} The Latte looks similar to the RV730 used in the Radeon HD4650/4670.
^{5} In most cases, especially in games, half of this data can be considered.

== See also ==
- List of Nvidia graphics processing units
- List of Intel graphics processing units
- List of AMD processors with 3D graphics
- Apple M1
- Video Coding Engine, AMD's equivalent SIP core till 2017
- Video Core Next, AMD's video core which combines the functionality of Video Coding Engine and Unified Video Decoder
