= List of Nvidia desktop graphics processing units =

This list contains general information about desktop graphics processing units (GPUs) and video cards from Nvidia, based on official specifications. In addition some Nvidia motherboards come with integrated onboard GPUs. Limited/special/collectors' editions or AIB versions are not included. Please do not edit the tables to match your specific AIB model.

== Field explanations ==
The fields in the table listed below describe the following:

- Model – The marketing name for the processor, assigned by Nvidia.
- Launch Date – Date of release for the processor.
- Code Name – The internal engineering codename for the processor (typically designated by an NVXY name and later GXY where X is the series number and Y is the schedule of the project for that generation).
- Fab – Fabrication process. Average feature size of components of the processor.
- Bus interface – Bus by which the graphics processor is attached to the system (typically an expansion slot, such as PCI, AGP, or PCI-Express).
- Memory – The amount of graphics memory available to the processor.
- Base Clock – The factory core clock frequency; while some manufacturers adjust clocks lower and higher, this number will always be the reference clocks used by Nvidia.
- Memory Clock – The factory effective memory clock frequency (while some manufacturers adjust clocks lower and higher, this number will always be the reference clocks used by Nvidia). All DDR/GDDR memories operate at half this frequency, except for GDDR5, which operates at one quarter of this frequency.
- Core Config – The layout of the graphics pipeline, in terms of functional units. Over time the number, type, and variety of functional units in the GPU core has changed significantly; before each section in the list there is an explanation as to what functional units are present in each generation of processors. In later models, shaders are integrated into a unified shader architecture, where any one shader can perform any of the functions listed.
- Fillrate – Maximum theoretical fill rate in textured pixels per second. This number is generally used as a maximum throughput number for the GPU and generally, a higher fill rate corresponds to a more powerful (and faster) GPU.
- Memory subsection
  - Bandwidth – Maximum theoretical bandwidth for the processor at factory clock with factory bus width. GHz = 10^{9} Hz.
  - Bus type – Type of memory bus or buses used.
  - Bus width – Maximum bit width of the memory bus or buses used. This will always be a factory bus width.
- API support section
  - Direct3D – Maximum version of Direct3D fully supported.
  - OpenGL – Maximum version of OpenGL fully supported.
  - OpenCL – Maximum version of OpenCL fully supported.
  - Vulkan – Maximum version of Vulkan fully supported.
  - CUDA - Maximum version of Cuda fully supported.
- Features – Added features that are not standard as a part of the two graphics libraries.

== Pre-GeForce ==
- Pre-GeForce consists of the NV1 generation, Riva generation, & TNT2 generation.

Model	Launch Date	Code Name	Fab (nm)	Transistors (million)	Die Size (mm^{2})	Bus Interface	Clock Rate		Core Config	Memory Configuration				Pixel Shader (MP/s)	Fillrate		API Support		TDP (Watts)	MSRP (USD)
Model	Launch Date	Code Name	Fab (nm)	Transistors (million)	Die Size (mm^{2})	Bus Interface	Core (MHz)	Memory (MHz)	Core Config	Size (MB)	Bus Type	Bus Width (bit)	Bandwidth (GB/s)	Pixel Shader (MP/s)	Texel (MT/s)	Pixel (MP/s)	Direct3D	OpenGL	TDP (Watts)	MSRP (USD)
STG-2000	September; 30, 1995	NV1	SGS; 500 nm	1	135	PCI	75	50	1:1:1	1	FPM	64	0.40	75.0			1.2	—N/a	?	$249
NV1	September; 30, 1995	NV1	SGS; 500 nm	1	135	PCI	75	60	1:1:1	2	EDO	64	0.48	75.0			1.2	—N/a	2	$299
Riva 128	April; 1, 1997	NV3	SGS; 350 nm	4	71	AGP; 2x	100		1:1:1	4	SDR	128	1.60	100.0			5.0	1.0	4	$199
Riva 128	April; 1, 1997	NV3	SGS; 350 nm	4	71	PCI	100		1:1:1	4	SDR	128	1.60	100.0			5.0	1.0	4	$199
Riva 128ZX	February; 23, 1998	NV3	SGS; 350 nm	4	71	AGP; 2x	100		1:1:1	8	SDR	128	1.60	100.0			5.0	1.0	?	$199
Riva TNT	May; 23, 1998	NV4	TSMC; 350 nm	7	128	AGP; 2x	90	110	2:2:2	16	SDR	128	1.76	180.0			5.0	1.2	?	$199
Vanta LT	March; 1, 2000	NV6	TSMC; 250 nm	15	63	AGP; 2x	105	100	2:2:2	8; 16	SDR	64	0.800	210.0			6.0	1.2	?	OEM
Riva TNT2 Vanta	March; 22, 1999	NV6	TSMC; 250 nm	15	63	AGP; 4x	100	133	2:2:2	8	SDR	64	1.06	200			6.0	1.2	?	$49
Riva TNT2 Vanta-16	March; 22, 1999	NV6	TSMC; 250 nm	15	63	AGP; 4x	100	133	2:2:2	16	SDR	64	1.06	200			6.0	1.2	?	$99
Riva TNT2 M64	October; 12, 1999	NV6	TSMC; 250 nm	15	63	AGP; 4x	125	143	2:2:2	16	SDR	64	1.14	250.0			6.0	1.2	?	$149
Riva TNT2 M64 Pro	October; 12, 1999	NV6	TSMC; 250 nm	15	63	AGP; 4x	125	143	2:2:2	32	SDR	64	1.14	250.0			6.0	1.2	?	$179
Riva TNT2	October; 12, 1999	NV5	TSMC; 250 nm	15	63	AGP; 4x	125	150	2:2:2	16	SDR	128	2.40	250.0			6.0	1.2	?	$249
Riva TNT2 Pro	October; 12, 1999	NV5	TSMC; 250 nm	15	63	AGP; 4x	143	167	2:2:2	32	SDR	128	2.67	286.0			6.0	1.2	?	$279
Riva TNT2 Ultra	March; 15, 1999	NV5	TSMC; 250 nm	15	63	AGP; 4x	150	183	2:2:2	32	SDR	128	2.93	300.0			6.0	1.2	?	$299

== GeForce 256 series ==
- All models are built on the TSMC 220 nm process and support Direct3D 7.0,OpenGL 1.2, hardware Transform, Lighting (T&L), & Cube Environment Mapping.

Model	Launch Date	Code Name	Transistors (million)	Die Size (mm^{2})	Bus Interface	Clock Rate		Core Config	Memory Configuration				Pixel Shader (MP/s)	Fillrate		TDP (Watts)	MSRP (USD)
Model	Launch Date	Code Name	Transistors (million)	Die Size (mm^{2})	Bus Interface	Core (MHz)	Memory (MHz) (MT/s)	Core Config	Size (MB)	Bus Type	Bus Width (bit)	Bandwidth (GB/s)	Pixel Shader (MP/s)	Texel (MT/s)	Pixel (MP/s)	TDP (Watts)	MSRP (USD)
GeForce 256 SDR	October; 11, 1999	NV10	17	139	AGP; 4x	120	166 (166)	4:4:4	32; 64	SDR	128	2.65	480.0			13	$249
GeForce 256 DDR	December; 13, 1999	NV10	17	139	AGP; 4x	120	150 (300)	4:4:4	32; 64	DDR	128	4.80	480.0			12	$249

== GeForce2 series ==
- All models are built on the TSMC 180 nm process and support Direct3D 7.0, TwinView Dual-Display Architecture, Second-Generation Transform and Lighting (T&L), Nvidia Shading Rasterizer (NSR), & High-Definition Video Processor (HDVP).
- All GeForce2 MX models support OpenGL 1.2 & Digital Vibrance Control (DVC).
- All GeForce2 non-MX models support OpenGL 1.5.

Model	Launch Date	Code Name	Transistors (million)	Die Size (mm^{2})	Bus Interface	Clock Rate		Core Config	Memory Configuration				Pixel Shader (MP/s)	Fillrate		TDP (Watts)	MSRP (USD)
Model	Launch Date	Code Name	Transistors (million)	Die Size (mm^{2})	Bus Interface	Core (MHz)	Memory (MHz) (MT/s)	Core Config	Size (MB)	Bus Type	Bus Width (bit)	Bandwidth (GB/s)	Pixel Shader (MP/s)	Texel (MT/s)	Pixel (MP/s)	TDP (Watts)	MSRP (USD)
GeForce2 MX + nForce 220	June; 4, 2001	NV1A	20	65	AGP; 4x	175	System shared up to 133 (266)	2:4:2	System shared up to 128	System shared DDR	System shared 64	System shared up to 1.06	350.0	700.0	350.0	3	OEM
GeForce2 MX + nForce 420	June; 4, 2001	NV1A	20	65	AGP; 4x	175	System shared up to 133 (266)	2:4:2	System shared up to 128	System shared DDR	System shared 64 or 128	System shared up to 4.27	350.0	700.0	350.0	3	OEM
GeForce2 MX	June; 28, 2000	NV11	20	64	PCI	175	166 (166)	2:4:2	32	SDR	64	1.33	350.0	700.0	350.0	4	$149
GeForce2 MX	June; 28, 2000	NV11	20	64	AGP; 4x	175	166 (166)	2:4:2	32	SDR	128	2.66	350.0	700.0	350.0	4	$179
GeForce2 MX DH Pro TV (Note: Included more display outputs.)	June; 28, 2000	NV11	20	64	PCI	175	166 (166)	2:4:2	32	SDR	128	2.66	350.0	700.0	350.0	4	$149
GeForce2 MX DH Pro TV	June; 28, 2000	NV11	20	64	AGP; 4x	175	166 (166)	2:4:2	32	SDR	128	2.66	350.0	700.0	350.0	4	$179
GeForce2 MX 200 LP	March; 3, 2001	NV11B	20	64	AGP; 4x	175	166 (166)	2:4:2	32	SDR	64	1.33	350.0	700.0	350.0	1	$99
GeForce2 MX 200	March; 3, 2001	NV11B	20	64	PCI	175	166 (166)	2:4:2	64	SDR	64	1.33	350.0	700.0	350.0	1	$49
GeForce2 MX 200	March; 3, 2001	NV11B	20	64	AGP; 4x	175	166 (166)	2:4:2	32	SDR	64	1.33	350.0	700.0	350.0	1	$99
GeForce2 MX 400	March; 3, 2001	NV11B	20	64	AGP; 4x	200	166 (166)	2:4:2	32	SDR	128	2.66	400.0	800.0	400.0	5	$129
GeForce2 GTS	April; 26, 2000	NV15	25	88	AGP; 4x	200	166 (332)	4:8:4	32	DDR	128	5.31	800.0	1,600.0	800.0	6	$349
GeForce2 GTS PRO	April; 26, 2000	NV15	25	88	AGP; 4x	200	200 (400)	4:8:4	32	DDR	128	6.40	800.0	1,600.0	800.0	?	$349
GeForce2 PRO	December; 5, 2000	NV15	25	88	AGP; 4x	200	200 (400)	4:8:4	64	DDR	128	6.40	800.0	1,600.0	800.0	?	$329
GeForce2 Ti	October; 1, 2001	NV15	25	88	AGP; 4x	250	200 (400)	4:8:4	64	DDR	128	6.40	1,000.0	2,000.0	1,000.0	?	$149
GeForce2 Ultra	August; 14, 2000	NV15	25	88	AGP; 4x	250	230 (460)	4:8:4	64	DDR	128	7.36	1,000.0	2,000.0	1,000.0	?	$499

== GeForce3 series ==
- All models are built on the TSMC 150 nm process and support Direct3D 8.1, OpenGL 1.5, 3D Textures, Lightspeed Memory Architecture (LMA), nFiniteFX Engine, & Shadow Buffers.

Model	Launch Date	Code Name	Transistors (million)	Die Size (mm^{2})	Bus Interface	Clock Rate		Core Config	Memory Configuration				Compute Throughput		Fillrate		TDP (Watts)	MSRP (USD)
Model	Launch Date	Code Name	Transistors (million)	Die Size (mm^{2})	Bus Interface	Core (MHz)	Memory (MHz) (MT/s)	Core Config	Size (MB)	Bus Type	Bus Width (bit)	Bandwidth (GB/s)	Pixel Shader (MP/s)	Vertex Shader (MV/s) (Note: NVIDIA officially advertises 1/4 the maximum MV/s for Vertex Shader's performance compared to the theoretical maximum as it is more realistic for real world applications.)	Texel (MT/s)	Pixel (MP/s)	TDP (Watts)	MSRP (USD)
GeForce3 Ti200	October; 1, 2001	NV20	57	128	AGP; 4x	175	200 (400)	4:1:8:4	64; 128	DDR	128	6.40	700.0	175.0	1,400.0	700.0	?	$149
GeForce3	February; 27, 2001	NV20	57	128	AGP; 4x	200	230 (460)	4:1:8:4	64	DDR	128	7.36	800.0	200.0	1,600.0	800.0	?	$449
GeForce3 Ti500	October; 1, 2001	NV20	57	128	AGP; 4x	240	250 (500)	4:1:8:4	64	DDR	128	8.00	960.0	240.0	1,920.0	960.0	29	$349

== GeForce4 series ==
- All models are built on the TSMC 150 nm process and support VPE 1.0, Accuview Antialiasing (AA), Lightspeed Memory Architecture II (LMA II), & nView.

Model	Launch Date	Code Name	Transistors (million)	Die Size (mm^{2})	Bus Interface	Clock Rate		Core Config	Memory Configuration				Compute Throughput		Fillrate		Supported APIs		TDP (Watts)	MSRP (USD)
Model	Launch Date	Code Name	Transistors (million)	Die Size (mm^{2})	Bus Interface	Core (MHz)	Memory (MHz) (MT/s)	Core Config	Size (MB)	Bus Type	Bus Width (bit)	Bandwidth (GB/s)	Pixel Shader (GP/s)	Vertex Shader (GV/s) (Note: NVIDIA officially advertises 1/4 the maximum GV/s for Vertex Shader's performance compared to the theoretical maximum as it is more realistic for real world applications.)	Texel (GT/s)	Pixel (GP/s)	Direct3D	OpenGL	TDP (Watts)	MSRP (USD)
GeForce4 MX IGP + nForce2	October; 1, 2002	NV1F	29	65	AGP; 4x	200	System shared up to 200 (400)	2:0:4:2	System shared up to 128	System shared DDR	System shared 64 or 128	System shared up to 6.40	0.400	—N/a	0.800	0.400	8.0	1.3	?	OEM
GeForce4 MX 420	February; 6, 2002	NV17	29	65	PCI	250	166 (166)	2:0:4:2	64	SDR	64	1.33	0.500	—N/a	1.000	0.500	7.0	1.5	14	$99
GeForce4 MX 420	February; 6, 2002	NV17	29	65	AGP; 4x	250	166 (166)	2:0:4:2	64	SDR	128	2.66	0.500	—N/a	1.000	0.500	7.0	1.5	14	$99
GeForce4 MX 420	February; 6, 2002	NV17	29	65	AGP; 4x	250	166 (332)	2:0:4:2	64	DDR	64	2.66	0.500	—N/a	1.000	0.500	7.0	1.5	14	$99
GeForce4 MX 440 SE	February; 6, 2002	NV18	29	65	AGP; 8x	250	200 (400)	2:0:4:2	64; 128	DDR	64	3.20	0.500	—N/a	1.000	0.500	7.0	1.5	13	$149
GeForce4 MX 440 SE	February; 6, 2002	NV17	29	65	AGP; 4x	250	166 (332)	2:0:4:2	64; 128	DDR	128	5.31	0.500	—N/a	1.000	0.500	7.0	1.5	13	$149
GeForce4 MX 440	February; 6, 2002	NV17	29	65	AGP; 4x	275	200 (400)	2:0:4:2	64	DDR	128	6.40	0.550	—N/a	1.100	0.550	7.0	1.5	18	$149
GeForce4 MX 440 Mac Edition	February; 6, 2002	NV17	29	65	AGP; 4x	275	200 (400)	2:0:4:2	64	DDR	128	6.40	0.550	—N/a	1.100	0.550	7.0	1.5	18	OEM
GeForce4 MX 440 8x	September; 26, 2002	NV18-A1	29	65	AGP; 8x	275	250 (500)	2:0:4:2	64; 128	DDR	128	8.00	0.550	—N/a	1.100	0.550	7.0	1.5	19	$149 $179
GeForce4 MX 440 8x	September; 26, 2002	NV18-A2	29	65	AGP; 8x	275	250 (500)	2:0:4:2	32	DDR	32	2.00	0.550	—N/a	1.100	0.550	7.0	1.5	19	$79
GeForce4 MX 440 8x	September; 26, 2002	NV18-A2	29	65	AGP; 8x	275	250 (500)	2:0:4:2	64	DDR	64	4.00	0.550	—N/a	1.100	0.550	7.0	1.5	19	$149
GeForce4 MX 440 8x	September; 26, 2002	NV18-A2	29	65	AGP; 8x	275	250 (500)	2:0:4:2	128	DDR	128	8.00	0.550	—N/a	1.100	0.550	7.0	1.5	19	$179
GeForce4 MX 460	February; 6, 2002	NV17	29	65	AGP; 4x	300	225 (450)	2:0:4:2	64; 128	DDR	128	7.20	0.600	—N/a	1.200	0.600	7.0	1.5	22	$179
GeForce4 MX 4000	December; 14, 2003	NV18C	29	65	PCI	250	166 (332)	2:0:4:2	128	DDR	64	2.66	0.500	—N/a	1.000	0.500	7.0	1.5	14	$99
GeForce4 MX 4000	December; 14, 2003	NV18	29	65	AGP; 8x	250	166 (332)	2:0:4:2	128	DDR	64	2.66	0.500	—N/a	1.000	0.500	7.0	1.5	14	$99
GeForce4 MX 4000 Rev. 2	December; 14, 2003	NV18C	29	65	AGP; 8x	250	166 (332)	2:0:4:2	128	DDR	64	2.66	0.500	—N/a	1.000	0.500	7.0	1.5	14	$99
GeForce4 Ti 4200	February; 6, 2002	NV25	63	142	AGP; 4x	250	250 (500)	4:2:8:4	64; 128	DDR	64	4.00	1.000	0.500	2.000	1.000	8.1	1.5	33	$199
GeForce4 Ti 4200	February; 6, 2002	NV25	63	142	AGP; 4x	250	250 (500)	4:2:8:4	64; 128	DDR	128	8.00	1.000	0.500	2.000	1.000	8.1	1.5	33	$199
GeForce4 Ti 4200 8x	February; 6, 2002	NV28	63	142	AGP; 8x	250	250 (250)	4:2:8:4	64; 128	SDR	128	4.00	1.000	0.500	2.000	1.000	8.1	1.5	34	$199
GeForce PCX 4300	February; 19, 2004	NV18C	29	65	PCIe; 1.0 x16	250	166 (332)	2:0:2:2	64	DDR	64	2.66	0.500	—N/a	0.500		7.0	1.5	18	$199
GeForce4 Ti 4400	February; 6, 2002	NV25	63	142	AGP; 4x	275	275 (550)	4:2:8:4	128	DDR	128	8.80	1.100	0.550	2.200	1.100	8.1	1.5	37	$299
GeForce4 Ti 4600	February; 6, 2002	NV25	63	142	AGP; 4x	300	324 (648)	4:2:8:4	128	DDR	128	10.37	1.200	0.600	2.400	1.200	8.1	1.5	?	$399
GeForce4 Ti 4800 SE (Note: This model is also known as the GeForce4 Ti 4400 8x.)	February; 16, 2003	NV28	63	142	AGP; 8x	275	275 (550)	4:2:8:4	128	DDR	128	8.80	1.100	0.550	2.200	1.100	8.1	1.5	38	$299
GeForce4 Ti 4800 (Note: This model is also known as the GeForce4 Ti 4600 8x.)	March; 15, 2003	NV28	63	142	AGP; 8x	300	325 (650)	4:2:8:4	128	DDR	128	10.40	1.200	0.600	2.400	1.200	8.1	1.5	43	$349
Model	Launch Date	Code Name	Transistors (million)	Die Size (mm^{2})	Bus Interface	Core (MHz)	Memory (MHz) (MT/s)	Core Config	Size (MB)	Bus Type	Bus Width (bit)	Bandwidth (GB/s)	Pixel Shader (GP/s)	Vertex Shader (GV/s)	Texel (GT/s)	Pixel (GP/s)	Direct3D	OpenGL	TDP (Watts)	MSRP (USD)
Model	Launch Date	Code Name	Transistors (million)	Die Size (mm^{2})	Bus Interface	Clock Rate		Core Config	Memory Configuration				Compute Throughput		Fillrate		Supported APIs		TDP (Watts)	MSRP (USD)

== GeForce FX (5xxx) series ==
- All models support VPE 2.0, Direct3D 9.0a, & OpenGL 1.5 (Full) and 2.0 (Partial), but supports version 2.1 via software with latest drivers.

Model	Launch Date	Code Name	Fab (nm)	Transistors (million)	Die Size (mm^{2})	Bus Interface	Clock Rate		Core Config	Memory Configuration				Compute Throughput		Fillrate		TDP (Watts)	Power Connectors	MSRP (USD)
Model	Launch Date	Code Name	Fab (nm)	Transistors (million)	Die Size (mm^{2})	Bus Interface	Core (MHz)	Memory (MHz) (MT/s)	Core Config	Size (MB)	Bus Type	Bus Width (bit)	Bandwidth (GB/s)	Pixel Shader (GP/s)	Vertex Shader (GV/s) (Note: NVIDIA officially advertises 1/4 the maximum GV/s for Vertex Shader's performance compared to the theoretical maximum as it is more realistic for real world applications.)	Texel (GT/s)	Pixel (GP/s)	TDP (Watts)	Power Connectors	MSRP (USD)
GeForce FX 5100	March; 6, 2003	NV34	TSMC; 150 nm	45	124	AGP; 8x	200	166 (332)	4:2:4:4	64	DDR	64	2.66	0.800	0.400	0.800		?	None	OEM
GeForce FX 5200 LE	March; 17, 2003	NV34	TSMC; 150 nm	45	124	AGP; 8x	250	166 (332)	4:2:4:4	128	DDR	64	2.66	1.000	0.500	1.000	1.000	?	None	$69
GeForce FX 5200	March; 6, 2003	NV34B	TSMC; 150 nm	45	91	PCI	250	200 (400)	4:2:4:4	256	DDR	128	6.40	1.000	0.500	1.000	1.000	?	None	$69
GeForce FX 5200	March; 6, 2003	NV18C	TSMC; 150 nm	29	65	AGP; 8x	250	200 (400)	2:0:4:2	128	DDR	128	6.40	0.500	—N/a	1.000	0.500	?	None	$69
GeForce FX 5200	March; 6, 2003	NV34	TSMC; 150 nm	45	124	AGP; 8x	250	200 (400)	4:2:4:4	128	DDR	128	6.40	1.000	0.500	1.000	1.000	21	None	$99
GeForce FX 5200 Rev. 2	March; 6, 2003	NV34B	TSMC; 150 nm	45	91	AGP; 8x	250	200 (400)	4:2:4:4	128	DDR	64	3.20	1.000	0.500	1.000	1.000	?	None	$69
GeForce FX 5200 Ultra Mac Edition	March; 6, 2003	NV34	TSMC; 150 nm	45	124	AGP; Pro 8x	325	325 (650)	4:2:4:4	128	DDR	128	10.40	1.400	0.700	1.400		32	None	OEM
GeForce FX 5200 Ultra	March; 6, 2003	NV34	TSMC; 150 nm	45	124	AGP; 8x	325	325 (650)	4:2:4:4	128	DDR	128	10.40	1.400	0.700	1.400		32	1x Molex	$149
GeForce PCX 5300	February; 17, 2004	NV37	TSMC; 150 nm	45	91	PCIe; 1.0 x16	250	200 (400)	4:2:4:4	128	DDR	128	6.40	1.000	0.500	1.000		21	None	OEM
GeForce FX 5500	March; 17, 2004	NV34B	TSMC; 150 nm	45	91	PCI	270	200 (400)	4:2:4:4	256	DDR	128	6.40	1.080	0.540	1.080		?	None	$99
GeForce FX 5500	March; 17, 2004	NV34B	TSMC; 150 nm	45	91	AGP; 8x	270	166 (332)	4:2:4:4	64; 128; 256	DDR	128	5.31	1.080	0.540	1.080		?	None	$37 $49 $79
GeForce FX 5600 XT	March; 17, 2003	NV31	TSMC; 130 nm	80	121	PCI	235	200 (400)	4:2:4:4	64	DDR	128	6.40	0.940	0.470	0.940		?	None	$179
GeForce FX 5600 XT	March; 17, 2003	NV31	TSMC; 130 nm	80	121	AGP; 8x	235	200 (400)	4:2:4:4	128	DDR	128	6.40	0.940	0.470	0.940		?	None	$199
GeForce FX 5600	March; 6, 2003	NV31	TSMC; 130 nm	80	121	AGP; 8x	325	250 (500)	4:2:4:4	128	DDR	128	8.00	1.300	0.650	1.300		37	None	$179
GeForce FX 5600 Ultra	March; 17, 2003	NV31	TSMC; 130 nm	80	121	AGP; 8x	400	400 (800)	4:2:4:4	128	DDR	128	12.80	1.600	0.800	1.600		27	1x Molex	$199
GeForce FX 5700 VE	September; 1, 2004	NV36	IBM; 130 nm	82	133	AGP; 8x	250	200 (400)	4:3:4:4	128	DDR	128	6.40	1.000	0.750	1.000		20	None	$149
GeForce FX 5700 LE	March; 1, 2004	NV36	IBM; 130 nm	82	133	PCI	250	200 (400)	4:3:4:4	128	DDR	64	3.20	1.000	0.750	1.000		21	None	$149
GeForce FX 5700 LE	March; 1, 2004	NV36	IBM; 130 nm	82	133	AGP; 8x	250	200 (400)	4:3:4:4	128; 256	DDR	64	3.20	1.000	0.750	1.000		21	None	$149
GeForce FX 5700 EP	September; 1, 2004	NV36	IBM; 130 nm	82	133	AGP; 8x	425	200 (400)	4:3:4:4	128	DDR	64	3.20	1.700	1.275	1.700		?	None	OEM
GeForce FX 5700 E.S.	August; 18, 2003	NV36S	IBM; 130 nm	82	133	AGP; 8x	425	250 (500)	4:3:4:4	128	DDR	128	8.00	1.700	1.275	1.700		25	1x Molex	—N/a
GeForce FX 5700	October; 23, 2003	NV36B	IBM; 130 nm	82	133	AGP; 8x	425	250 (500)	4:3:4:4	128; 256	DDR	128	8.00	1.700	1.275	1.700		25	None	$149
GeForce FX 5700 Ultra	October; 23, 2003	NV36B	IBM; 130 nm	82	133	AGP; 8x	475	453 (906)	4:3:4:4	128	GDDR2	128	14.50	1.900	1.425	1.900		46	1x Molex	$199
GeForce PCX 5750	February; 17, 2004	NV39	TSMC; 130 nm	82	125	PCIe; 1.0 x16	425	275 (550)	4:3:4:4	128	DDR	128	8.80	1.700	1.275	1.700		50	None	$199
GeForce FX 5800	March; 6, 2003	NV30	TSMC; 130 nm	125	199	AGP; 8x	400	400 (800)	4:3:8:4	128	GDDR2	128	12.80	1.600	1.200	3.200	1.600	44	1x Molex	$299
GeForce FX 5800 Ultra	March; 6, 2003	NV30	TSMC; 130 nm	125	199	AGP; 8x	500	500 (1000)	4:3:8:4	128	GDDR2	128	16.00	2.000	1.500	4.000	2.000	66	1x Molex	$399
GeForce FX 5900 ZT	May; 12, 2003	NV35	TSMC; 130 nm	135	207	AGP; 8x	325	350 (700)	4:3:8:4	128	DDR	256	22.40	1.300	0.975	2.600	1.300	?	1x Molex	OEM
GeForce FX 5900 XT	May; 12, 2003	NV35	TSMC; 130 nm	135	207	AGP; 8x	400	350 (700)	4:3:8:4	128	DDR	256	22.40	1.600	1.200	3.200	1.600	35	1x Molex	$179
GeForce FX 5900	May; 12, 2003	NV35	TSMC; 130 nm	135	207	AGP; 8x	400	425 (850)	4:3:8:4	128	DDR	256	27.20	1.600	1.200	3.200	1.600	55	1x Molex	$399
GeForce PCX 5900	March; 17, 2003	NV35	TSMC; 130 nm	135	207	PCIe; 1.0 x16	350	275 (550)	4:3:8:4	128; 256	DDR	256	17.60	1.400	1.050	2.800	1.400	49	None	$399
GeForce FX 5900 Ultra	October; 23, 2003	NV35	TSMC; 130 nm	135	207	AGP; 8x	450	425 (550)	4:3:8:4	256	DDR	256	27.20	1.800	1.350	3.600	1.800	59	1x Molex	$499
GeForce FX 5950 Ultra	October; 23, 2003	NV38	TSMC; 130 nm	135	207	AGP; 8x	475	475 (950)	4:3:8:4	256	DDR	256	37.40	1.900	1.425	3.800	1.900	74	1x Molex	$499
Model	Launch Date	Code Name	Fab (nm)	Transistors (million)	Die Size (mm^{2})	Bus Interface	Core (MHz)	Memory (MHz) (MT/s)	Core Config	Size (MB)	Bus Type	Bus Width (bit)	Bandwidth (GB/s)	Pixel Shader (GP/s)	Vertex Shader (GV/s)	Texel (GT/s)	Pixel (GP/s)	TDP (Watts)	Power Connectors	MSRP (USD)
Model	Launch Date	Code Name	Fab (nm)	Transistors (million)	Die Size (mm^{2})	Bus Interface	Clock Rate		Core Config	Memory Configuration				Compute Throughput		Fillrate		TDP (Watts)	Power Connectors	MSRP (USD)

== GeForce 6 (6xxx) series ==
- All models support Direct3D 9.0c (9_3) & PureVideo 1 with VP1 Engine, except the 6200 AGP (NV18C Core), which supports Direct3D 7.0 and lacks PureVideo and VP1 Support.
- All models support Transparency AA (starting with version 91.47 of the ForceWare drivers).

Model	Launch Date	Code Name	Fab (nm)	Transistors (million)	Die Size (mm^{2})	Bus Interface	Clock Rate		Core Config	Memory Configuration				Compute Throughput		Fillrate		Features					TDP (Watts)	Power Connectors	MSRP (USD)
Model	Launch Date	Code Name	Fab (nm)	Transistors (million)	Die Size (mm^{2})	Bus Interface	Core (MHz)	Memory (MHz) (MT/s)	Core Config	Size (MB)	Bus Type	Bus Width (bit)	Bandwidth (GB/s)	Pixel Shader (GP/s)	Vertex Shader (GV/s) (Note: NVIDIA officially advertises 1/4 the maximum GV/s for Vertex Shader's performance compared to the theoretical maximum as it is more realistic for real world applications.)	Texel (GT/s)	Pixel (GP/s)	OpenEXR HDR	SLI	TurboCache	PureVideo WMV9	OpenGL	TDP (Watts)	Power Connectors	MSRP (USD)
GeForce 6100	October; 11, 2004	C51	TSMC; 90 nm	?		PCI (HyperTransport)	425	System shared up to 200 (400) or 533 (1066)	2:1:1:1	System shared up to 256	System shared DDR or DDR2	System shared 64 or 128	System shared up to 6.40 or 17.06	0.850	0.425			No	No	No	Yes (Limited) (Note: Lacks support for 1080p video decoding as well as support for certain video formats. Only supports up to 720p/1080i.)	2.0 (Full); 2.1 (Partial)	?	None	OEM
GeForce 6100 + nForce 400	October; 11, 2004	C61	TSMC; 90 nm	?		PCI (HyperTransport)	425	System shared up to 200 (400) or 533 (1066)	2:1:1:1	System shared up to 256	System shared DDR or DDR2	System shared 64 or 128	System shared up to 6.40 or 17.06	0.850	0.425			No	No	No	Yes (Limited)	2.0 (Full); 2.1 (Partial)	?	None	OEM
GeForce 6100 + nForce 405	October; 11, 2004	C61	TSMC; 90 nm	?		PCI (HyperTransport)	425	System shared up to 200 (400) or 533 (1066)	2:1:1:1	System shared up to 256	System shared DDR or DDR2	System shared 64 or 128	System shared up to 6.40 or 17.06	0.850	0.425			No	No	No	Yes (Limited)	2.0 (Full); 2.1 (Partial)	?	None	OEM
GeForce 6100 + nForce 410	October; 11, 2004	C51	TSMC; 90 nm	?		PCI (HyperTransport)	425	System shared up to 200 (400) or 533 (1066)	2:1:1:1	System shared up to 256	System shared DDR or DDR2	System shared 64 or 128	System shared up to 6.40 or 17.06	0.850	0.425			No	No	No	Yes (Limited)	2.0 (Full); 2.1 (Partial)	?	None	OEM
GeForce 6100 + nForce 420	October; 11, 2004	C61	TSMC; 90 nm	?		PCI (HyperTransport)	425	System shared up to 200 (400) or 533 (1066)	2:1:1:1	System shared up to 256	System shared DDR or DDR2	System shared 64 or 128	System shared up to 6.40 or 17.06	0.850	0.425			No	No	No	Yes (Limited)	2.0 (Full); 2.1 (Partial)	?	None	OEM
GeForce 6100 + nForce 430	October; 11, 2004	C61	TSMC; 90 nm	?		PCI (HyperTransport)	425	System shared up to 200 (400) or 533 (1066)	2:1:1:1	System shared up to 256	System shared DDR or DDR2	System shared 64 or 128	System shared up to 6.40 or 17.06	0.850	0.425			No	No	No	Yes (Limited)	2.0 (Full); 2.1 (Partial)	?	None	OEM
GeForce 6150 SE + nForce 430	October; 11, 2004	C61	TSMC; 90 nm	?		PCI (HyperTransport)	425	System shared up to 200 (400) or 533 (1066)	2:1:1:1	System shared up to 256	System shared DDR or DDR2	System shared 64 or 128	System shared up to 6.40 or 17.06	0.850	0.425			No	No	Yes (Driver- based only)	Yes (Limited)	2.0 (Full); 2.1 (Partial)	?	None	OEM
GeForce 6150 LE + nForce 430	October; 11, 2004	C51	TSMC; 90 nm	?		PCI (HyperTransport)	425	System shared up to 200 (400) or 533 (1066)	2:1:1:1	System shared up to 256	System shared DDR or DDR2	System shared 64 or 128	System shared up to 6.40 or 17.06	0.850	0.425			No	No	Yes (Driver- based only)	Yes	2.0 (Full); 2.1 (Partial)	?	None	OEM
GeForce 6150 + nForce 430	October; 11, 2004	C51	TSMC; 90 nm	?		PCI (HyperTransport)	475	System shared up to 200 (400) or 533 (1066)	2:1:1:1	System shared up to 256	System shared DDR or DDR2	System shared 64 or 128	System shared up to 6.40 or 17.06	0.950	0.475			No	No	No	Yes	2.0 (Full); 2.1 (Partial)	?	None	OEM
GeForce 6200 SE TurboCache	December; 15, 2004	NV44	TSMC; 110 nm	75	110	PCIe; 1.0 x16	350	250 (500)	4:3:4:2	64	DDR	32	2.00	1.400	1.050	1.400	0.700	No	No	Yes	Yes	2.0 (Full); 2.1 (Partial)	?	None	OEM
GeForce 6200 LE	October; 11, 2004	NV43	TSMC; 110 nm	146	154	PCI	300	266 (532)	4:3:4:2	256	DDR	64	4.26	1.200	0.900	1.200	0.600	No	No	No	Yes	2.0 (Full); 2.1 (Partial)	?	None	$149
GeForce 6200 LE	April; 4, 2005	NV44	TSMC; 110 nm	75	110	AGP; 8x	350	266 (532)	2:1:2:2	128	DDR	64	4.26	0.700	0.350	0.700		No	No	No	Yes	2.0 (Full); 2.1 (Partial)	?	None	OEM
GeForce 6200 LE 512	October; 11, 2004	NV44	TSMC; 110 nm	75	110	AGP; 8x	300	275 (550)	4:3:4:2	512	DDR2	128	8.80	1.200	0.900	1.200	0.600	No	No	No	Yes	2.0 (Full); 2.1 (Partial)	?	None	$79
GeForce 6200 LE	April; 4, 2005	NV44	TSMC; 110 nm	75	110	PCIe; 1.0 x16	350	266 (532)	2:1:2:2	64	DDR2	32	2.13	0.700	0.350	0.700		No	No	Yes	Yes	2.0 (Full); 2.1 (Partial)	?	None	OEM
GeForce 6200 LE	April; 4, 2005	NV44	TSMC; 110 nm	75	110	PCIe; 1.0 x16	350	266 (532)	2:1:2:2	128	DDR	64	4.26	0.700	0.350	0.700		No	No	Yes	Yes	2.0 (Full); 2.1 (Partial)	?	None	$129
GeForce 6200 PCI	January; 16, 2008	NV44	TSMC; 110 nm	75	110	PCI	280	200 (400)	4:3:4:2	256; 512	DDR2	64	3.20	1.120	0.840	1.120	0.560	No	No	No	Yes	2.0 (Full); 2.1 (Partial)	20	None	$129
GeForce 6200 TurboCache	December; 15, 2004	NV44B	TSMC; 110 nm	75	110	AGP; 4x	350	250 (500)	4:3:4:2	64	DDR	64	4.00	1.400	1.050	1.400	0.700	No	No	No	Yes	2.0 (Full); 2.1 (Partial)	25	None	$129
GeForce 6200 AGP	December; 14, 2003	NV18C	TSMC; 150 nm	29	65	AGP; 8x	230	66 (133)	2:0:4:2	128	DDR	64	1.06	0.460	—N/a	0.920	0.460	No	No	No	No	1.5	?	None	?
GeForce 6200 AGP	April; 4, 2005	NV44A	TSMC; 110 nm	75	110	AGP; 8x	350	250 (500)	4:2:4:4	128; 256	DDR	64	4.00	1.400	0.700	1.400		No	No	No	Yes	2.0 (Full); 2.1 (Partial)	?	None	$169
GeForce 6200 AGP	April; 4, 2005	NV44A	TSMC; 110 nm	75	110	AGP; 8x	350	266 (532)	4:3:4:2	256	DDR2	64	4.26	1.400	1.050	1.400	0.700	No	No	No	Yes	2.0 (Full); 2.1 (Partial)	?	None	$129
GeForce 6200	October; 11, 2004	NV43	TSMC; 110 nm	146	154	PCIe; 1.0 x16	300	275 (550)	4:3:4:2	128	DDR	128	8.80	1.200	0.900	1.200	0.600	No	No	Yes	Yes	2.0 (Full); 2.1 (Partial)	?	None	$129
GeForce 6200 X2	January; 16, 2008	2x NV44	TSMC; 110 nm	2x 75	2x 110	PCI	280	200 (400)	2x 4:3:4:2	2x 256; 2x 512	DDR2	2x 64	2x 3.20	2x 1.120	2x 0.840	2x 1.120	2x 0.560	No	No	No	Yes	2.0 (Full); 2.1 (Partial)	?	1x 6-Pin	$89
GeForce 6500	October; 1, 2005	NV44	TSMC; 110 nm	75	110	PCIe; 1.0 x16	400	266 (532)	4:3:4:2	128	DDR2	128	8.51	1.600	1.200	1.600	0.800	No	Yes	Yes	Yes	2.0 (Full); 2.1 (Partial)	?	None	$99
GeForce 6600 VE	2005	NV43	TSMC; 110 nm	146	154	PCIe; 1.0 x16	300	200 (400)	4:2:4:4	128	GDDR3	128	6.40	1.200	0.600	1.200	1.200	Yes	Yes	No	Yes	2.0 (Full); 2.1 (Partial)	?	None	$99
GeForce 6600 LE	2005	NV43	TSMC; 110 nm	146	154	AGP; 8x	300	200 (400)	4:3:4:2	128	DDR	128	6.40	1.200	0.900	1.200	0.600	Yes	No	No	Yes	2.0 (Full); 2.1 (Partial)	?	None	$149
GeForce 6600 LE	2005	NV43	TSMC; 110 nm	146	154	PCIe; 1.0 x16	300	250 (500)	4:3:4:2	128	DDR	128	8.00	1.200	0.900	1.200	0.600	Yes	Yes	No	Yes	2.0 (Full); 2.1 (Partial)	?	None	$149
GeForce 6600	August; 12, 2004	NV43	TSMC; 110 nm	146	154	AGP; 8x	300	250 (500)	8:3:8:4	128; 256	DDR	128	8.00	2.400	0.900	2.400	1.200	Yes	No	No	Yes	2.0 (Full); 2.1 (Partial)	26	None	$149
GeForce 6600	August; 12, 2004	NV43	TSMC; 110 nm	146	154	PCIe; 1.0 x16	300	250 (500)	8:3:8:4	256; 512	DDR	128	8.00	2.400	0.900	2.400	1.200	Yes	Yes	No	Yes	2.0 (Full); 2.1 (Partial)	?	None	$149
GeForce 6600 GT	November; 14, 2004	NV43	TSMC; 110 nm	146	154	AGP; 8x	500	475 (950)	8:3:8:4	128	GDDR3	128	15.20	4.000	1.500	4.000	2.000	Yes	No	No	Yes	2.0 (Full); 2.1 (Partial)	47	1x Molex	$199
GeForce 6600 GT	August; 12, 2004	NV43	TSMC; 110 nm	146	154	PCIe; 1.0 x16	500	500 (1000)	8:3:8:4	128; 256	GDDR3	128	16.00	4.000	1.500	4.000	2.000	Yes	Yes	No	Yes	2.0 (Full); 2.1 (Partial)	?	None	$199
GeForce 6600 GT Dual	August; 12, 2004	2x NV43	TSMC; 110 nm	146	154	PCIe; 1.0 x16	500	560 (1120)	2x 8:3:8:4	2x 128	GDDR3	2x 128	2x 17.92	2x 4.000	2x 1.500	2x 4.000	2x 2.000	Yes	No	No	Yes	2.0 (Full); 2.1 (Partial)	?	1x 6-Pin	$599
GeForce 6610 XL	November; 14, 2004	NV43	TSMC; 110 nm	146	154	PCIe; 1.0 x16	400	400 (800)	8:3:8:4	128	GDDR3	128	12.80	3.200	1.200	3.200	1.600	Yes	No	No	Yes	2.0 (Full); 2.1 (Partial)	?	None	OEM
GeForce 6700 XL	November; 14, 2004	NV43	TSMC; 110 nm	146	154	PCIe; 1.0 x16	525	550 (1100)	8:3:8:4	128	GDDR3	128	17.60	4.200	1.580	4.200	2.100	Yes	No	No	Yes	2.0 (Full); 2.1 (Partial)	50	1x 6-Pin	OEM
GeForce 6800 XE	September; 30, 2005	NV40	TSMC; 130 nm	222	287	AGP; 8x	275	266 (532)	8:3:8:8	256	DDR2	128	8.51	2.200	0.825	2.200	2.000	Yes	No	No	No	2.0.3 (Full); 2.1 (Partial)	?	None	$199
GeForce 6800 LE AGP	July; 21, 2004	NV40	TSMC; 130 nm	222	287	AGP; 8x	300	350 (700)	8:4:8:8	128	DDR	256	22.40	2.400	1.200	2.400		Yes	No	No	No	2.0.3 (Full); 2.1 (Partial)	?	1x Molex	$249
GeForce 6800 LE AGP	January; 16, 2005	NV41	TSMC; 130 nm	190	225	PCIe; 1.0 x16	325	300 (600)	8:4:8:8	256	DDR	256	19.20	2.600	1.300	2.600		Yes	Yes	No	No	2.0 (Full); 2.1 (Partial)	?	None	$249
GeForce 6800 XT	September; 30, 2005	NV48	TSMC; 110 nm	222	287	AGP; 8x	300	266 (532)	8:4:8:8	256	DDR	128	8.51	2.400	1.200	2.400		Yes	No	No	No	2.0 (Full); 2.1 (Partial)	36	1x Molex	$219
GeForce 6800 XT	September; 30, 2005	NV40	TSMC; 130 nm	222	287	AGP; 8x	300	350 (700)	8:4:8:8	256	DDR	256	22.40	2.400	1.200	2.400		Yes	No	No	No	2.0.3 (Full); 2.1 (Partial)	36	1x Molex	$199
GeForce 6800 XT	September; 30, 2005	NV42	TSMC; 110 nm	202	222	AGP; 8x	450	600 (1200)	12:5:12:8	256	GDDR3	256	38.40	5.400	2.250	5.400	3.600	Yes	No	No	Yes	2.0 (Full); 2.1 (Partial)	36	1x Molex	$219
GeForce 6800 XT	September; 30, 2005	NV41	TSMC; 130 nm	190	225	PCIe; 1.0 x16	425	500 (1000)	8:4:8:8	256	GDDR3	256	32.00	3.400	1.700	3.400		Yes	Yes	No	No	2.0 (Full); 2.1 (Partial)	?	1x 6-Pin	$249
GeForce 6800	April; 14, 2004	NV48	TSMC; 110 nm	222	287	AGP; 8x	325	350 (700)	12:5:12:12	256	DDR	256	22.40	3.900	1.625	3.900	3.900	Yes	No	No	No	2.0 (Full); 2.1 (Partial)	40	1x Molex	OEM
GeForce 6800	April; 14, 2004	NV40	TSMC; 130 nm	222	287	AGP; 8x	325	350 (700)	12:5:12:12	128	DDR	256	22.40	3.900	1.625	3.900	3.900	Yes	No	No	No	2.0.3 (Full); 2.1 (Partial)	40	1x Molex	$299
GeForce 6800	November; 8, 2004	NV41	TSMC; 130 nm	190	225	PCIe; 1.0 x16	325	300 (600)	12:5:12:8	256	DDR	256	19.20	3.900	1.625	3.900	2.600	Yes	Yes	No	Yes	2.0 (Full); 2.1 (Partial)	?	None	$299
GeForce 6800 GTO	April; 14, 2004	NV45	TSMC; 130 nm	222	287	PCIe; 1.0 x16	350	500 (1000)	12:5:12:12	256	GDDR3	256	32.00	4.200	1.750	4.200		Yes	Yes	No	No	2.0 (Full); 2.1 (Partial)	?	1x 6-Pin	OEM
GeForce 6800 GS	December; 8, 2005	NV40	TSMC; 130 nm	222	287	AGP; 8x	350	500 (1000)	12:5:12:12	256	GDDR3	256	32.00	4.200	1.750	4.200		Yes	No	No	No	2.0.3 (Full); 2.1 (Partial)	59	1x Molex	$249
GeForce 6800 GS	November; 7, 2005	NV41	TSMC; 130 nm	190	225	PCIe; 1.0 x16	425	500 (1000)	12:5:12:8	256; 512	GDDR3	256	32.00	5.100	2.125	5.100	3.400	Yes	Yes	No	No	2.0 (Full); 2.1 (Partial)	?	1x 6-Pin	$249
GeForce 6800 GT AGP	April; 14, 2004	NV40	TSMC; 130 nm	222	287	AGP; 8x	350	250 (500)	16:6:16:16	128	DDR	256	16.00	5.600	2.100	5.600		Yes	No	No	No	2.0.3 (Full); 2.1 (Partial)	67	1x Molex	$399
GeForce 6800 GT AGP	April; 14, 2004	NV48	TSMC; 110 nm	222	287	AGP; 8x	350	500 (1000)	16:6:16:16	256	GDDR3	256	32.00	5.600	2.100	5.600		Yes	No	No	No	2.0 (Full); 2.1 (Partial)	67	1x Molex	$499
GeForce 6800 GT DDL	April; 14, 2004	NV40	TSMC; 130 nm	222	287	AGP; Pro 8x	350	500 (1000)	16:6:16:16	256	GDDR3	256	32.00	5.600	2.100	5.600		Yes	No	No	No	2.0.3 (Full); 2.1 (Partial)	80	None	OEM
GeForce 6800 GT	June; 8, 2004	NV45	TSMC; 130 nm	222	287	PCIe; 1.0 x16	350	500 (1000)	16:6:16:16	256	GDDR3	256	32.00	5.600	2.100	5.600		Yes	Yes	No	No	2.0 (Full); 2.1 (Partial)	67	1x 6-Pin	$399
GeForce 6800 GT Dual	June; 8, 2004	2x NV45	TSMC; 130 nm	2x 222	2x 287	PCIe; 1.0 x16	350	500 (1000)	2x 16:6:16:16	2x 256	GDDR3	2x 256	2x 32.00	2x 5.600	2x 2.100	2x 5.600		Yes	No	No	No	2.0 (Full); 2.1 (Partial)	?	1x 6-Pin	$499
GeForce 6800 Ultra AGP	April; 14, 2004	NV40	TSMC; 130 nm	222	287	AGP; 8x	425	550 (1100)	16:6:16:16	256	GDDR3	256	35.20	6.800	2.550	6.800		Yes	No	No	No	2.0.3 (Full); 2.1 (Partial)	?	2x Molex	$499
GeForce 6800 Ultra DDL	April; 14, 2004	NV40	TSMC; 130 nm	222	287	AGP; Pro 8x	400	550 (1100)	16:6:16:16	256	GDDR3	256	35.20	6.400	2.400	6.400		Yes	No	No	No	2.0.3 (Full); 2.1 (Partial)	100	None	OEM
GeForce 6800 Ultra	July; 26, 2004	NV45	TSMC; 130 nm	222	287	PCIe; 1.0 x16	425	550 (1100)	16:6:16:16	256	GDDR3	256	35.20	6.800	2.550	6.800		Yes	Yes	No	No	2.0 (Full); 2.1 (Partial)	81	1x 6-Pin	$499
Model	Launch Date	Code Name	Fab (nm)	Transistors (million)	Die Size (mm^{2})	Bus Interface	Core (MHz)	Memory (MHz) (MT/s)	Core Config	Size (MB)	Bus Type	Bus Width (bit)	Bandwidth (GB/s)	Pixel Shader (GP/s)	Vertex Shader (GV/s)	Texel (GT/s)	Pixel (GP/s)	OpenEXR HDR	SLI	TurboCache	PureVideo WMV9	OpenGL	TDP (Watts)	Power Connectors	MSRP (USD)
Model	Launch Date	Code Name	Fab (nm)	Transistors (million)	Die Size (mm^{2})	Bus Interface	Clock Rate		Core Config	Memory Configuration				Compute Throughput		Fillrate		Features					TDP (Watts)	Power Connectors	MSRP (USD)

== GeForce 7 (7xxx) series ==
- All models support Direct3D 9.0c (9_3), PureVideo 1 with VP1 Engine, & Transparency AA (starting with version 91.47 of the ForceWare drivers)
- All models using a GXX based core support gamma-correct antialiasing & 64-bit OpenEXR HDR.
- Models 7050 + nForce 610i through the 7300 GS support TurboCache.

Model	Launch Date	Code Name	Fab (nm)	Transistors (million)	Die Size (mm^{2})	Bus Interface	Clock Rate		Core Config	Memory Configuration				Compute Throughput		Fillrate		Features		TDP (Watts)	Power Connectors	MSRP (USD)
Model	Launch Date	Code Name	Fab (nm)	Transistors (million)	Die Size (mm^{2})	Bus Interface	Core (Boost) (MHz)	Memory (MHz) (MT/s)	Core Config	Size (MB)	Bus Type	Bus Width (bit)	Bandwidth (GB/s)	Pixel Shader (GP/s)	Vertex Shader (GV/s) (Note: NVIDIA officially advertises 1/4 the maximum GV/s for Vertex Shader's performance compared to the theoretical maximum as it is more realistic for real world applications.)	Texel (GT/s)	Pixel (GP/s)	SLI	OpenGL	TDP (Watts)	Power Connectors	MSRP (USD)
GeForce 7025 + nForce 630a	February; 1, 2006	C67	TSMC; 90 nm	112	81	PCI (HyperTransport)	425	System shared up to 400 (800)	2:1:1:1	System shared up to 512	System shared DDR2	System shared 64 or 128	System shared up to 12.80	0.850	0.425			No	2.0 (Full); 2.1 (Partial)	?	None	OEM (Note: Some non-OEM motherboards were available with these chipsets, but they were uncommon.)
GeForce 7025 + nForce 630a	February; 1, 2006	C68	TSMC; 90 nm	112	81	PCI (HyperTransport)	425	System shared up to 400 (800)	2:1:1:1	System shared up to 512	System shared DDR2	System shared 64 or 128	System shared up to 12.80	0.850	0.425			No	2.0 (Full); 2.1 (Partial)	?	None	OEM
GeForce 7050 SE + nForce 630a	February; 1, 2006	C68	TSMC; 90 nm	112	81	PCI (HyperTransport)	425	System shared up to 400 (800)	2:1:2:1	System shared up to 512	System shared DDR2	System shared 64 or 128	System shared up to 12.80	0.850	0.425	0.850	0.425	No	2.0 (Full); 2.1 (Partial)	?	None	OEM
GeForce 7050 PV + nForce 630a (Note: The 7050 PV was nearly identical to the 7050 SE, the only major differences being the 7050 PV model supported HDCP for Blu-ray playback, as well as came with HDMI outputs.)	February; 1, 2006	C68	TSMC; 90 nm	112	81	PCI (HyperTransport)	425	System shared up to 400 (800)	2:1:2:1	System shared up to 512	System shared DDR2	System shared 64 or 128	System shared up to 12.80	0.850	0.425	0.850	0.425	No	2.0 (Full); 2.1 (Partial)	?	None	OEM
GeForce 7050 + nForce 610i	January; 13, 2008	C73B	TSMC; 90 nm	112	81	PCI (HyperTransport)	500	System shared up to 400 (800)	2:1:2:2	System shared up to 512	System shared DDR2	System shared 64 or 128	System shared up to 12.80	1.000	0.500	1.000		No	2.0 (Full); 2.1 (Partial)	?	None	OEM
GeForce 7050 + nForce 620i	October; 4, 2007	C73	TSMC; 90 nm	112	81	PCI (HyperTransport)	500 (630)	System shared up to 400 (800)	2:1:2:2	System shared up to 512	System shared DDR2	System shared 64 or 128	System shared up to 12.80	1.000 (1.260)	0.500 (0.630)	1.000 (1.260)		No	2.0 (Full); 2.1 (Partial)	?	None	OEM
GeForce 7050 + nForce 630i (Note: The 7050 + 620i was nearly identical to the 7050 + 630i, the only major differences being the 7050 + 630i model supported higher FSB speeds of 1333MHz vs the typical 1066MHz, as well as supported newer Core 2 Quad CPUs.)	October; 4, 2007	C73	TSMC; 90 nm	112	81	PCI (HyperTransport)	500 (630)	System shared up to 400 (800)	2:1:2:2	System shared up to 512	System shared DDR2	System shared 64 or 128	System shared up to 12.80	1.000 (1.260)	0.500 (0.630)	1.000 (1.260)		No	2.0 (Full); 2.1 (Partial)	?	None	OEM
GeForce 7100 + nForce 630i	October; 4, 2007	C73	TSMC; 90 nm	112	81	PCI (HyperTransport)	600	System shared up to 400 (800)	4:1:2:2	System shared up to 512	System shared DDR2	System shared 64 or 128	System shared up to 12.80	2.400	0.600	1.200		No	2.0 (Full); 2.1 (Partial)	?	None	OEM
GeForce 7150 + nForce 630i	November; 16, 2007	C73	TSMC; 90 nm	112	81	PCI (HyperTransport)	630	System shared up to 400 (800)	2:1:2:2	System shared up to 512	System shared DDR2	System shared 64 or 128	System shared up to 12.80	1.260	0.630	1.260		No	2.0 (Full); 2.1 (Partial)	?	None	OEM
GeForce 7100 GS	August; 8, 2006	NV44B	TSMC; 110 nm	75	110	PCIe; 1.0 x16	350	266 (532)	4:3:4:2	128; 256	DDR2	64	4.26	1.400	1.050	1.400	0.700	Yes (Note: The GPUs: 7100 GS, 7300 GS, 7300 GT, 7500 LE, & 7600 LE can only function in SLI mode through the PCIe slot (bridgeless). All other GPUs that support SLI can use this feature too.)	2.0 (Full); 2.1 (Partial)	?	None	OEM
GeForce 7200 GS	January; 18, 2006	G72	TSMC; 90 nm	112	81	PCIe; 1.0 x16	450	334 (668)	2:2:4:2	128	DDR2	64	5.34	0.900		1.800	0.900	No	2.1	?	None	OEM
GeForce 7300 SE	March; 22, 2006	G72	TSMC; 90 nm	112	81	PCIe; 1.0 x16	450	266 (532)	4:3:4:2	256	DDR2	64	4.26	1.800	1.350	1.800	0.900	No	2.1	?	None	OEM
GeForce 7300 LE	March; 22, 2006	G72	TSMC; 90 nm	112	81	PCIe; 1.0 x16	450	324 (648)	4:3:4:2	128	DDR2	64	5.18	1.800	1.350	1.800	0.900	No	2.1	?	None	OEM
GeForce 7350 LE	March; 22, 2006	G72	TSMC; 90 nm	112	81	PCIe; 1.0 x16	450	400 (800)	4:3:4:2	128; 256	DDR2	64	6.40	1.800	1.350	1.800	0.900	No	2.1	?	None	OEM
GeForce 7300 GS	January; 18, 2006	G72	TSMC; 90 nm	112	81	PCIe; 1.0 x16	450	266 (532)	4:3:4:2	256	DDR2	64	4.26	1.800	1.350	1.800	0.900	Yes	2.1	23	None	$99
GeForce 7300 GT AGP	May; 15, 2006	G73B	TSMC; 80 nm	177	100	AGP; 8x	350	325 (650)	8:4:8:8	128; 256	DDR2	128	10.40	2.800	1.400	2.800		No	2.1	24	None	$99
GeForce 7300 GT AGP	May; 15, 2006	G73B	TSMC; 80 nm	177	100	AGP; 8x	350	325 (650)	8:4:8:8	512	GDDR3	128	10.40	2.800	1.400	2.800		No	2.1	24	None	$99
GeForce 7300 GT	May; 15, 2006	G73	TSMC; 90 nm	177	125	PCIe; 1.0 x16	350	325 (650)	8:4:8:8	128; 256	DDR2	128	10.40	2.800	1.400	2.800		Yes	2.1	24	None	$99
GeForce 7300 GT	May; 15, 2006	G73B	TSMC; 80 nm	177	100	PCIe; 1.0 x16	350	325 (650)	8:4:8:8	128; 256	DDR2	128	10.40	2.800	1.400	2.800		Yes	2.1	24	None	$99
GeForce 7300 GT Mac Edition	August; 26, 2006	G73	TSMC; 90 nm	177	125	PCIe; 1.0 x16	350	500 (1000)	8:4:8:8	128	GDDR3	128	16.00	2.800	1.400	2.800		No	2.1	24	None	OEM
GeForce 7500 LE	March; 22, 2006	G72	TSMC; 90 nm	112	81	PCIe; 1.0 x16	475	405 (810)	8:5:8:4	64; 128; 256	DDR2	64	6.48	3.800	2.375	3.800	1.900	Yes	2.1	?	None	OEM
GeForce 7600 LE	March; 22, 2006	G73B	TSMC; 80 nm	177	100	PCIe; 1.0 x16	400	400 (800)	8:4:8:8	256	DDR2	128	12.80	3.200	1.600	3.200		Yes	2.1	?	None	$129
GeForce 7600 GS AGP	July; 1, 2006	G73B	TSMC; 80 nm	177	100	AGP; 8x	400	400 (800)	12:5:12:8	256; 512	DDR2	128	12.80	4.800	2.000	4.800	3.200	No	2.1	27	1x Molex	$149
GeForce 7600 GS AGP	July; 1, 2006	G71	TSMC; 90 nm	278	196	AGP; 8x	500	725 (1450)	12:5:12:8	256	GDDR3	128	23.20	6.000	2.500	6.000	4.000	No	2.1.2 (Full); 3.x (Partial)	27	1x Molex	$159
GeForce 7600 GS	March; 22, 2006	G73B	TSMC; 80 nm	177	100	PCIe; 1.0 x16	400	400 (800)	12:5:12:8	256	DDR2	128	12.80	4.800	2.000	4.800	3.200	Yes	2.1	27	None	$129
GeForce 7650 GS	March; 22, 2006	G73B	TSMC; 80 nm	177	100	PCIe; 1.0 x16	450	400 (800)	12:5:12:8	256	DDR2	128	12.80	4.800	2.000	4.800	3.200	No	2.1	?	None	OEM
GeForce 7600 GT AGP	January; 8, 2007	G73B	TSMC; 80 nm	177	100	AGP; 8x	560	700 (1400)	12:5:12:8	256; 512	GDDR3	128	22.40	6.720	2.800	6.720	4.480	No	2.1	40	1x Molex	$199
GeForce 7600 GT	March; 9, 2006	G73B	TSMC; 80 nm	177	100	PCIe; 1.0 x16	560	700 (1400)	12:5:12:8	256	GDDR3	128	22.40	6.720	2.800	6.720	4.480	Yes	2.1	40	None	$199
GeForce 7600 GT Mac Edition	September; 2, 2006	G73	TSMC; 90 nm	177	125	PCIe; 1.0 x16	560	700 (1400)	12:5:12:8	256	GDDR3	128	22.40	6.720	2.800	6.720	4.480	No	2.1	40	None	OEM
GeForce 7600 GT Mac Edition	September; 2, 2006	G73B	TSMC; 80 nm	177	100	PCIe; 1.0 x16	560	700 (1400)	12:5:12:8	256	GDDR3	128	22.40	6.720	2.800	6.720	4.480	No	2.1	40	None	OEM
GeForce 7800 GS AGP	February; 2, 2006	G70	TSMC; 110 nm	302	333	AGP; 8x	375	600 (1200)	16:6:16:8	256	GDDR3	256	38.40	6.000	2.250	6.000	3.000	No	2.1	75	1x Molex	$299
GeForce 7800 GS+ AGP	September; 28 2006	G71	TSMC; 90 nm	278	196	AGP; 8x	375	600 (1200)	16:6:16:8	256	GDDR3	256	38.40	6.000	2.250	6.000	3.000	No	2.1.2 (Full); 3.x (Partial)	75	1x Molex	$299
GeForce 7800 GS AGP (20 Pipelines)	February; 2, 2006	G70	TSMC; 110 nm	302	333	AGP; 8x	425	625 (1250)	20:7:20:16	512	GDDR3	256	40.00	8.500	2.975	8.500	6.800	No	2.1	75	1x Molex	$499
GeForce 7800 GS+ AGP (20 Pipelines)	September; 28 2006	G71	TSMC; 90 nm	278	196	AGP; 8x	425	625 (1250)	20:7:20:16	512	GDDR3	256	40.00	8.500	2.975	8.500	6.800	No	2.1.2 (Full); 3.x (Partial)	75	1x Molex	$479
GeForce 7800 GS AGP (24 Pipelines)	February; 2, 2006	G70	TSMC; 110 nm	302	333	AGP; 8x	425	625 (1250)	24:8:24:16	512	GDDR3	256	40.00	10.200	3.400	10.200	6.800	No	2.1	75	1x Molex	$499
GeForce 7800 GS+ AGP (24 Pipelines)	September; 28 2006	G71	TSMC; 90 nm	278	196	AGP; 8x	425	625 (1250)	24:8:24:16	512	GDDR3	256	40.00	10.200	3.400	10.200	6.800	No	2.1.2 (Full); 3.x (Partial)	75	1x Molex	$499
GeForce 7800 GT	August; 11, 2005	G70	TSMC; 110 nm	302	333	PCIe; 1.0 x16	400	500 (1000)	20:7:20:16	256	GDDR3	256	32.00	8.000	2.800	8.000	6.400	Yes	2.1	65	1x 6-Pin	$499
GeForce 7800 GT Dual	August; 11, 2005	2x G70	TSMC; 110 nm	2x 302	2x 333	PCIe; 1.0 x16	400	500 (1000)	2x 20:7:20:16	2x 256	GDDR3	2x 256	2x 32.00	2x 8.000	2x 2.800	2x 8.000	2x 6.400	No	2.1	120	1x 6-Pin	$799
GeForce 7800 GTX	June; 22, 2005	G70	TSMC; 110 nm	302	333	PCIe; 1.0 x16	430	600 (1200)	24:8:24:16	256	GDDR3	256	38.40	10.320	3.440	10.320	6.880	Yes	2.1	86	1x 6-Pin	$599
GeForce 7800 GTX 512	November; 14, 2005	G70	TSMC; 110 nm	302	333	PCIe; 1.0 x16	500	800 (1600)	24:8:24:16	512	GDDR3	256	51.20	12.000	4.000	12.000	8.000	Yes	2.1	108	1x 6-Pin	$649
GeForce 7900 GS AGP	April; 2, 2006	G71	TSMC; 90 nm	278	196	AGP; 8x	450	660 (1320)	20:7:20:16	256	GDDR3	256	42.24	9.000	3.150	9.000	7.200	No	2.1.2 (Full); 3.x (Partial)	65	1x Molex	$259
GeForce 7900 GS	May; 1, 2006	G71	TSMC; 90 nm	278	196	PCIe; 1.0 x16	450	660 (1320)	20:7:20:16	256	GDDR3	256	42.24	9.000	3.150	9.000	7.200	Yes	2.1.2 (Full); 3.x (Partial)	49	1x 6-Pin	$259
GeForce 7900 GT	March; 9, 2006	G71	TSMC; 90 nm	278	196	PCIe; 1.0 x16	450	660 (1320)	24:8:24:16	256	GDDR3	256	42.24	10.800	3.600	10.800	7.200	Yes	2.1.2 (Full); 3.x (Partial)	48	1x 6-Pin	$299
GeForce 7900 GTO	October; 1, 2006	G71	TSMC; 90 nm	278	196	PCIe; 1.0 x16	650	660 (1320)	24:8:24:16	512	GDDR3	256	42.24	15.600	5.200	15.600	10.400	Yes	2.1.2 (Full); 3.x (Partial)	81	1x 6-Pin	$249
GeForce 7900 GTX	March; 9, 2006	G71	TSMC; 90 nm	278	196	PCIe; 1.0 x16	650	800 (1600)	24:8:24:16	512	GDDR3	256	51.20	15.600	5.200	15.600	10.400	Yes	2.1.2 (Full); 3.x (Partial)	84	1x 6-Pin	$499
GeForce 7900 GX2	April; 30, 2006	2x G71	TSMC; 90 nm	2x 278	2x 196	PCIe; 1.0 x16	500	600 (1200)	2x 24:8:24:16	2x 512	GDDR3	2x 256	2x 38.40	2x 12.000	2x 4.000	2x 12.000	2x 8.000	Yes	2.1.2 (Full); 3.x (Partial)	110	2x 6-Pin	$599
GeForce 7950 GT AGP	April; 2, 2007	G71	TSMC; 90 nm	278	196	AGP; 8x	500	600 (1200)	24:8:24:16	512	GDDR3	256	38.40	12.000	4.000	12.000	8.000	No	2.1.2 (Full); 3.x (Partial)	65	1x Molex	$269
GeForce 7950 GT	August; 6, 2006	G71	TSMC; 90 nm	278	196	PCIe; 1.0 x16	550	700 (1400)	24:8:24:16	512	GDDR3	256	44.80	13.200	4.400	13.200	8.800	Yes	2.1.2 (Full); 3.x (Partial)	65	1x 6-Pin	$299
GeForce 7950 GX2	June; 5, 2006	2x G71	TSMC; 90 nm	2x 278	2x 196	PCIe; 1.0 x16	500	600 (1200)	2x 24:8:24:16	2x 512	GDDR3	2x 256	2x 38.40	2x 12.000	2x 4.000	2x 12.000	2x 8.000	No	2.1.2 (Full); 3.x (Partial)	110	1x 6-Pin	$599
Model	Launch Date	Code Name	Fab (nm)	Transistors (million)	Die Size (mm^{2})	Bus Interface	Core (Boost) (MHz)	Memory (MHz) (MT/s)	Core Config	Size (MB)	Bus Type	Bus Width (bit)	Bandwidth (GB/s)	Pixel Shader (GP/s)	Vertex Shader (GV/s)	Texel (GT/s)	Pixel (GP/s)	SLI	OpenGL	TDP (Watts)	Power Connectors	MSRP (USD)
Model	Launch Date	Code Name	Fab (nm)	Transistors (million)	Die Size (mm^{2})	Bus Interface	Clock Rate		Core Config	Memory Configuration				Compute Throughput		Fillrate		Features		TDP (Watts)	Power Connectors	MSRP (USD)

== GeForce 8 (8xxx) series ==
- All models support coverage sample anti-aliasing, angle-independent anisotropic filtering, & 128-bit OpenEXR HDR.
- All models support OpenGL 3.3 & Compute Capability 1.1.
- All non-mGPU models support OpenCL 1.1.
- All models support Direct3D 11.1 (10_0) except the 8400 GS Rev. 3, which supports 11.1 (10.1) instead.
- All models built on the 90 nm process support CUDA 1.0, all models built on the 80 nm & 65 nm process support CUDA 1.1, & all models built on the 40 nm process support CUDA 1.2.

Model	Launch Date	Code Name	Fab (nm)	Transistors (million)	Die Size (mm^{2})	Bus Interface	Clock Rate			Core Config	Memory Configuration				Cache L2 (KB)	Fillrate		Processing Power (GFLOPS) Single Precision	Video Engine	SLI	TDP (Watts)	Power Connectors	MSRP (USD)
Model	Launch Date	Code Name	Fab (nm)	Transistors (million)	Die Size (mm^{2})	Bus Interface	Core (MHz)	Shader (MHz)	Memory (MHz) (MT/s)	Core Config	Size (MB)	Bus Type	Bus Width (bit)	Bandwidth (GB/s)	Cache L2 (KB)	Pixel (GP/s)	Texture (GT/s)	Processing Power (GFLOPS) Single Precision	Video Engine	SLI	TDP (Watts)	Power Connectors	MSRP (USD)
GeForce 8100 + nForce 720a	May; 6, 2008	C78	TSMC; 80 nm	210	127	PCI (HyperTransport)	500	1200	System shared up to 400 (800) or 533 (1066)	16:8:4:2	System shared up to 512	System shared DDR2 or DDR3	System shared 64 or 128	System shared up to 12.80 or 17.06	—N/a	2.00	4.00	38.400	PureVideo 3 with VP3; Engine + BSP Engine & AES128	No	40	None	?
GeForce 8200	May; 6, 2008	C78	TSMC; 80 nm	210	127	PCI (HyperTransport)	500	1200	System shared up to 400 (800) or 533 (1066)	16:8:4:2	System shared up to 512	System shared DDR2 or DDR3	System shared 64 or 128	System shared up to 12.80 or 17.06	—N/a	2.00	4.00	38.400	PureVideo 3 with VP3; Engine + BSP Engine & AES128	No	40	None	?
GeForce 8300	May; 6, 2008	C78	TSMC; 80 nm	210	127	PCI (HyperTransport)	500	1500	System shared up to 400 (800) or 533 (1066)	16:8:4:2	System shared up to 512	System shared DDR2 or DDR3	System shared 64 or 128	System shared up to 12.80 or 17.06	—N/a	2.00	4.00	48.000	PureVideo 3 with VP3; Engine + BSP Engine & AES128	No	40	None	?
GeForce 8300 GS	April; 17, 2007	G86S	TSMC; 80 nm	210	127	PCIe; 1.0 x16	459	918	400 (800)	8:8:4:1	128	DDR2	64	6.40	16	1.84	3.67	14.688	PureVideo 2 with VP2; Engine + BSP Engine & AES128	No	40	None	OEM
GeForce 8400	December; 4, 2007	G98S	UMC; 65 nm	210	86	PCIe; 2.0 x16	540	1300	500 (1000)	8:4:4:1	256	DDR2	64	8.00	16	2.16		20.800	PureVideo 2 with VP2; Engine + BSP Engine & AES128	No	25	None	OEM
GeForce 8400 GS PCI	December; 4, 2007	G98S	UMC; 65 nm	210	86	PCI	567	1400	333 (666)	8:4:4:1	512	DDR2	64	5.33	16	2.27		22.400	PureVideo 2 with VP2; Engine + BSP Engine & AES128	No	25	None	~$80
GeForce 8400 GS PCI Rev.2	April; 17, 2007	GT218S	TSMC; 40 nm	260	57	PCI	520	1230	500 (1000)	16:8:4:2	512	DDR3	64	8.00	32	2.08	4.16	39.360	PureVideo 4 with VP4; Engine	No	40	None	~$70
GeForce 8400 SE	August; 1, 2008	G86S	TSMC; 80 nm	210	127	PCIe; 1.0 x16	459	918	400 (800)	16:8:4:2	128; 256; 512	DDR2	64	6.40	16	1.84	3.67	29.376	PureVideo 2 with VP2; Engine + BSP Engine & AES128	No	50	None	OEM
GeForce 8400 GS	April; 17, 2007	G86-213-A2	TSMC; 40 nm	210	127	PCIe; 1.0 x16	459	918	400 (800)	16:8:4:2	256; 512	DDR2	64	6.40	16	1.84	3.67	29.376	PureVideo 2 with VP2; Engine + BSP Engine & AES128	No	40	None	OEM (Note: The 8400 GS eventually became a retail model very shortly after its release at roughly $60 USD.)
GeForce 8400 GS Rev. 2	December; 4, 2007	G98-409-U2	UMC; 65 nm	210	86	PCIe; 2.0 x16	567	1400	400 (800)	8:8:4:1	512	DDR2	64	6.40	16	2.27		22.400	PureVideo 2 with VP2; Engine + BSP Engine & AES128	No	25	None	~$60
GeForce 8400 GS Rev. 3	July; 12, 2010	GT218S	TSMC; 40 nm	260	57	PCIe; 2.0 x16	520	1230	400 (800)	16:8:4:2	512	DDR2	64	6.40	32	2.08	4.16	39.360	PureVideo 4 with VP4; Engine	No	25	None	~$50
GeForce 8500 GT	April; 17, 2007	G86-300-A2	TSMC; 80 nm	210	127	PCIe; 1.0 x16	459	918	400 (800)	16:8:4:2	256; 512; 1024	GDDR3	128	12.80	32	1.84	3.67	29.376	PureVideo 2 with VP2; Engine + BSP Engine & AES128	2-Way	30	None	$129
GeForce 8600 GS	April; 17, 2007	G84	TSMC; 80 nm	289	169	PCIe; 1.0 x16	540	1190	400 (800)	16:8:8:2	512	DDR2	128	12.80	32	4.32		38.080	PureVideo 2 with VP2; Engine + BSP Engine & AES128	2-Way	47	None	OEM
GeForce 8600 GT	April; 17, 2007	G84-303-A2	TSMC; 80 nm	289	169	PCIe; 1.0 x16	540	1190	700 (1400)	32:16:8:4	512; 1024	GDDR3	128	22.40	32	4.32	8.64	76.160	PureVideo 2 with VP2; Engine + BSP Engine & AES128	2-Way	47	None	$159
GeForce 8600 GT Mac Edition	April; 17, 2007	G84-303-A2	TSMC; 80 nm	289	169	PCIe; 1.0 x16	600	1450	750 (1500)	32:16:8:4	128	GDDR3	128	24.00	32	4.80	9.60	92.800	PureVideo 2 with VP2; Engine + BSP Engine & AES128	2-Way	47	None	$159
GeForce 8600 GTS	April; 17, 2007	G84-400-A2	TSMC; 80 nm	289	169	PCIe; 1.0 x16	675	1450	1000 (2000)	32:16:8:4	256; 512	GDDR3	128	32.00	32	5.40	10.80	92.800	PureVideo 2 with VP2; Engine + BSP Engine & AES128	2-Way	60	1x 6-Pin	$199
GeForce 8600 GTS Mac Edition	September; 21, 2007	G84-400-A2	TSMC; 80 nm	289	169	PCIe; 1.0 x16	675	1450	1008 (2016)	32:16:8:4	512	GDDR3	128	32.26	32	5.40	10.80	92.800	PureVideo 2 with VP2; Engine + BSP Engine & AES128	2-Way	75	1x 6-Pin	$199
GeForce 8800 GS	January; 31, 2008	G92-150-A2	TSMC; 65 nm	754	324	PCIe; 2.0 x16	550	1375	800 (1600)	96:48:12:12	384; 768	GDDR3	192	38.40	48	6.60	26.40	264.000	PureVideo 2 with VP2; Engine + BSP Engine & AES128	2-Way	105	1x 6-Pin	OEM
GeForce 8800 GT	October; 29, 2007	G92-270-A2	TSMC; 65 nm	754	324	PCIe; 2.0 x16	600	1500	900 (1800)	112:56:16:14	512	GDDR3	256	57.60	64	9.60	33.60	336.000	PureVideo 2 with VP2; Engine + BSP Engine & AES128	2-Way	125	1x 6-Pin	$349
GeForce 8800 GT Mac Edition	February; 1, 2008	G92-270-A2	TSMC; 65 nm	754	324	PCIe; 2.0 x16	600	1500	900 (1800)	112:56:16:14	512	GDDR3	256	57.60	64	9.60	33.60	336.000	PureVideo 2 with VP2; Engine + BSP Engine & AES128	2-Way	125	1x 6-Pin	$349
GeForce 8800 GTS 320	February; 12, 2007	G80-100-K0-A2	TSMC; 90 nm	681	484	PCIe; 1.0 x16	513	1188	792 (1584)	96:24:20:12	320	GDDR3	320	63.36	80	10.26	14.36	228.096 (342.144) (Note: The G80 Core could perform 3x ops/clock compared to the typical 2x ops/clock. This was thanks to what NVIDIA called a "SFU" or Special Function Unit, which added roughly 1x op/clock on top of the 2x ops/clock.)	PureVideo 1 with VP1; Engine	2-Way	143	1x 6-Pin	$269
GeForce 8800 GTS 640	November; 8, 2006	G80-100-K0-A2	TSMC; 90 nm	681	484	PCIe; 1.0 x16	513	1188	792 (1584)	96:24:20:12	640	GDDR3	320	63.36	80	10.26	14.36	228.096 (342.144)	PureVideo 1 with VP1; Engine	2-Way	143	1x 6-Pin	$449
GeForce 8800 GTS Core 112	November; 19, 2007	G80-100-K0-A2	TSMC; 90 nm	681	484	PCIe; 1.0 x16	500	1200	800 (1600)	112:28:20:14	640	GDDR3	320	64.00	80	10.00	14.00	268.800 (403.200)	PureVideo 1 with VP1; Engine	2-Way	150	1x 6-Pin	$399
GeForce 8800 GTS 512	December; 11, 2007	G92-400-A2	TSMC; 65 nm	754	324	PCIe; 2.0 x16	650	1625	820 (1600)	128:64:16:16	512	GDDR3	256	52.48	64	10.40	41.60	416.000	PureVideo 2 with VP2; Engine + BSP Engine & AES128	2-Way	135	1x 6-Pin	$349
GeForce 8800 GTX	November; 8, 2006	G80-300-A2	TSMC; 90 nm	681	484	PCIe; 1.0 x16	576	1350	900 (1800)	128:32:24:16	768	GDDR3	384	86.40	96	13.82	18.43	345.600 (518.400)	PureVideo 1 with VP1; Engine	3-Way	155	2x 6-Pin	$599
GeForce 8800 Ultra	May; 2, 2007	G80-450-A3	TSMC; 90 nm	681	484	PCIe; 1.0 x16	612	1512	1080 (2160)	128:32:24:16	768	GDDR3	384	103.70	96	14.69	19.58	387.072 (580.608)	PureVideo 1 with VP1; Engine	3-Way	171	2x 6-Pin	$829
Model	Launch Date	Code Name	Fab (nm)	Transistors (million)	Die Size (mm^{2})	Bus Interface	Core (MHz)	Shader (MHz)	Memory (MHz) (MT/s)	Core Config	Size (MB)	Bus Type	Bus Width (bit)	Bandwidth (GB/s)	Cache L2 (KB)	Pixel (GP/s)	Texture (GT/s)	Processing Power (GFLOPS) Single Precision	Video Engine	SLI	TDP (Watts)	Power Connectors	MSRP (USD)
Model	Launch Date	Code Name	Fab (nm)	Transistors (million)	Die Size (mm^{2})	Bus Interface	Clock Rate			Core Config	Memory Configuration				Cache L2 (KB)	Fillrate		Processing Power (GFLOPS) Single Precision	Video Engine	SLI	TDP (Watts)	Power Connectors	MSRP (USD)

== GeForce 9 (9xxx) series ==
- All models support Coverage Sample Anti-Aliasing, Angle-Independent Anisotropic Filtering, & 128-bit OpenEXR HDR.
- All models support Direct3D 11.1 (10_0), OpenGL 3.3, CUDA 1.1, & Compute Capability 1.1.
- All non-mGPU models support OpenCL 1.1.
- All models support 2-Way SLI except for the 9800 GTX & 9800 GTX+ which support 3-Way.

Model	Launch Date	Code Name	Fab (nm)	Transistors (million)	Die Size (mm^{2})	Bus Interface	Clock Rate			Core Config	Memory Configuration				Cache L2 (KB)	Fillrate		Processing Power (GFLOPS)	Video Engine	TDP (Watts)	Power Connectors	MSRP USD
Model	Launch Date	Code Name	Fab (nm)	Transistors (million)	Die Size (mm^{2})	Bus Interface	Core (MHz)	Shader (MHz)	Memory (MHz) (MT/s)	Core Config	Size (MB)	Bus Type	Bus Width (bit)	Bandwidth (GB/s)	Cache L2 (KB)	Pixel (GP/s)	Texture (GT/s)	Processing Power (GFLOPS)	Video Engine	TDP (Watts)	Power Connectors	MSRP USD
GeForce 9100	May; 6, 2008	C78	TSMC; 80 nm	210	127	PCI	500	1200	System shared up to 400 (800) or 533 (1066)	16:8:4:2	System shared up to 1536	System shared DDR2 or DDR3	System shared 64 or 128	System shared up to 12.80 or 17.06	—N/a	2.00	4.00	38.400	PureVideo 3 with VP3; Engine + BSP Engine & AES128	?	None	?
GeForce 9200	May; 6, 2008	C78	TSMC; 80 nm	210	127	PCI	500	1200	System shared up to 400 (800) or 533 (1066)	16:8:4:2	System shared up to 1536	System shared DDR2 or DDR3	System shared 64 or 128	System shared up to 12.80 or 17.06	—N/a	2.00	4.00	38.400	PureVideo 3 with VP3; Engine + BSP Engine & AES128	?	None	?
GeForce 9200 (C79 Core)	June; 18, 2008	C79	TSMC; 65 nm	314	144	PCI	450	1100	System shared up to 400 (800) or 533 (1066)	16:8:4:2	System shared up to 1536	System shared DDR2 or DDR3	System shared 64 or 128	System shared up to 12.80 or 17.06	—N/a	1.80	3.60	35.200	PureVideo 3 with VP3; Engine + BSP Engine & AES128	?	None	?
GeForce 9300 + nForce 730i	June; 18, 2008	C79	TSMC; 65 nm	314	144	PCI	450	1100	System shared up to 400 (800) or 533 (1066)	16:8:4:2	System shared up to 1536	System shared DDR2 or DDR3	System shared 64 or 128	System shared up to 12.80 or 17.06	—N/a	1.80	3.60	35.200	PureVideo 3 with VP3; Engine + BSP Engine & AES128	?	None	?
GeForce 9400	June; 18, 2008	C79	TSMC; 65 nm	314	144	PCI	450	1100	System shared up to 400 (800) or 533 (1066)	16:8:4:2	System shared up to 1536	System shared DDR2 or DDR3	System shared 64 or 128	System shared up to 12.80 or 17.06	—N/a	1.80	3.60	35.200	PureVideo 3 with VP3; Engine + BSP Engine & AES128	?	None	?
GeForce 9400 (C7A Core)	October; 15, 2008	C7A	TSMC; 80 nm	210	127	PCI	580	1400	System shared up to 400 (800) or 533 (1066)	16:8:4:2	System shared up to 1536	System shared DDR2 or DDR3	System shared 64 or 128	System shared up to 12.80 or 17.06	—N/a	2.32	4.64	44.800	PureVideo 3 with VP3; Engine + BSP Engine & AES128	?	None	?
GeForce 9300 SE	June; 1, 2008	G98S	TSMC; 65 nm	210	86	PCIe; 2.0 x16	540	1300	400 (800)	8:4:4:1	256	DDR2	64	6.40	16	2.16		20.800	PureVideo 2 with VP2; Engine + BSP Engine & AES128	25	None	OEM
GeForce 9300 GE	June; 1, 2008	G98	TSMC; 55 nm	210	80	PCIe; 2.0 x16	540	1300	400 (800)	8:4:4:1	256	DDR2	64	6.40	16	2.16		20.800	PureVideo 2 with VP2; Engine + BSP Engine & AES128	50	None	OEM
GeForce 9300 GS	June; 1, 2008	G98S	TSMC; 65 nm	210	86	PCIe; 2.0 x16	567	1400	333 (666)	8:4:4:1	512	DDR2	64	5.33	16	2.27		22.400	PureVideo 2 with VP2; Engine + BSP Engine & AES128	35	None	OEM
GeForce 9300 GS Rev. 2	March; 12, 2011	GT218-670-B1	TSMC; 40 nm	260	57	PCIe; 2.0 x16	589	1402	333 (666)	16:8:4:2	256	DDR2	64	5.33	32	2.36	4.71	44.864	PureVideo 4 with VP4; Engine	?	None	OEM
GeForce 9400 GT (G86 Core)	August; 1 2008	G86S	TSMC; 80 nm	210	127	PCIe; 2.0 x16	459	918	600 (1200)	16:8:4:2	128; 256; 512	DDR2	64	9.60	16	1.836	3.672	29.376	PureVideo 2 with VP2; Engine + BSP Engine & AES128	50	None	?
GeForce 9400 GT PCI	August; 27, 2008	G96-200-C1	TSMC; 55 nm	314	121	PCI	550	1400	400 (800)	16:8:4:2	256	DDR2	128	12.80	32	2.20	4.40	44.800	PureVideo 2 with VP2; Engine + BSP Engine & AES128	50	None	?
GeForce 9400 GT	August; 27, 2008	G96-200-C1	TSMC; 55 nm	314	121	PCIe; 2.0 x16	550	1400	400 (800)	16:8:4:2	512	DDR2	128	12.80	32	2.20	4.40	44.800	PureVideo 2 with VP2; Engine + BSP Engine & AES128	50	None	?
GeForce 9400 GT Rev. 2	August; 27, 2008	G96-200-C1	TSMC; 55 nm	314	121	PCIe; 2.0 x16	550	1400	400 (800)	16:8:4:2	512; 1024	GDDR3	128	12.80	32	2.20	4.40	44.800	PureVideo 2 with VP2; Engine + BSP Engine & AES128	50	None	?
GeForce 9400 GT Rev. 3	June; 13, 2012	GT218-670-B1	TSMC; 40 nm	260	57	PCIe; 2.0 x16	589	1402	600 (1200)	16:8:4:2	128	DDR2	64	9.60	32	2.36	4.71	44.864	PureVideo 4 with VP4; Engine	50	None	?
GeForce 9500 GS	July; 29, 2008	G96-259-A1	UMC; 65 nm	314	144	PCIe; 2.0 x16	550	1375	504 (1008)	32:16:8:4	512	DDR2	128	16.13	32	4.40	8.80	88.000	PureVideo 2 with VP2; Engine + BSP Engine & AES128	40	None	OEM
GeForce 9500 GS Rev. 2	July; 29, 2008	G96C	TSMC; 55 nm	314	121	PCIe; 2.0 x16	500	1250	500 (1000)	32:16:8:4	512	DDR2	128	16.00	32	4.00	8.00	80.000	PureVideo 2 with VP2; Engine + BSP Engine & AES128	40	None	OEM
GeForce 9500 GT	July; 29, 2008	G96-300-C1	UMC; 65 nm	314	144	PCIe; 2.0 x16	600	1500	1000 (2000)	32:16:8:4	512	GDDR3	128	32.00	32	4.80	9.60	96.000	PureVideo 2 with VP2; Engine + BSP Engine & AES128	50	None	?
GeForce 9500 GT Rev. 2	July; 29, 2008	G96-309-B1	UMC; 55 nm	314	121	PCIe; 2.0 x16	600	1500	900 (1800)	32:16:8:4	512	GDDR3	128	28.80	32	4.80	9.60	96.000	PureVideo 2 with VP2; Engine + BSP Engine & AES128	50	None	?
GeForce 9500 GT Rev. 3	July; 29, 2008	G96-300-C1	TSMC; 55 nm	314	121	PCIe; 2.0 x16	550	1400	800 (1600)	32:16:8:4	512	GDDR3	128	25.60	32	4.40	8.80	89.600	PureVideo 2 with VP2; Engine + BSP Engine & AES128	50	None	?
GeForce 9500 GT Mac Edition	May; 19, 2010	G96C	TSMC; 55 nm	314	121	PCIe; 2.0 x16	550	1400	800 (1600)	32:16:8:4	512	GDDR3	128	25.60	32	4.40	8.80	89.600	PureVideo 2 with VP2; Engine + BSP Engine & AES128	50	None	OEM
GeForce 9600 GS	July; 29, 2008	G94-300-A1	TSMC; 65 nm	505	240	PCIe; 2.0 x16	500	1250	1000 (2000)	48:24:12:6	768	DDR2	192	48.00	48	6.00	12.00	120.000	PureVideo 2 with VP2; Engine + BSP Engine & AES128	?	1x 6-Pin	OEM
GeForce 9600 GSO	April; 28, 2008	G92-150-A2	TSMC; 65 nm	754	324	PCIe; 2.0 x16	550	1375	800 (1600)	96:48:12:12	384; 768; 1536	GDDR3	192	38.40	48	6.60	26.40	264.000	PureVideo 2 with VP2; Engine + BSP Engine & AES128	84	1x 6-Pin	$169
GeForce 9600 GSO 512	October; 23, 2008	G94-300-A1; G94B	TSMC; 65 nm 55 nm	505	240; 196	PCIe; 2.0 x16	650	1625	900 (1800)	48:24:16:6	512	GDDR3	256	57.60	64	10.40	15.60	156.000	PureVideo 2 with VP2; Engine + BSP Engine & AES128	90	1x 6-Pin	$189
GeForce 9600 GT Green Edition	February; 21, 2008	G94-300-A1; G94B	TSMC; 65 nm 55 nm	505	240; 196	PCIe; 2.0 x16	600	1500	700 (1400)	64:32:16:8	512; 1024	GDDR3	256	44.80	64	9.60	19.20	192.000	PureVideo 2 with VP2; Engine + BSP Engine & AES128	59 (Note: Core voltage is limited to 1.00v to maintain a lower TDP)	None	$179
GeForce 9600 GT	February; 21, 2008	G94-300-A1	TSMC; 65 nm	505	240	PCIe; 2.0 x16	650	1625	900 (1800)	64:32:16:8	512; 1024	GDDR3	256	57.60	64	10.40	20.80	208.000	PureVideo 2 with VP2; Engine + BSP Engine & AES128	95	1x 6-Pin	$179
GeForce 9600 GT Rev. 2	February; 21, 2008	G94-358-B1	TSMC; 55 nm	505	196	PCIe; 2.0 x16	650	1625	900 (1800)	64:32:16:8	512; 1024	GDDR3	256	57.60	64	10.40	20.80	208.000	PureVideo 2 with VP2; Engine + BSP Engine & AES128	95	1x 6-Pin	$179
GeForce 9600 GT Mac Edition	December; 22, 2008	G94-300-A1	TSMC; 65 nm	505	240	PCIe; 2.0 x16	600	1500	266 (532)	64:32:16:8	1024	DDR2	256	17.02	64	9.60	19.20	192.000	PureVideo 2 with VP2; Engine + BSP Engine & AES128	95	1x 6-Pin	OEM
GeForce 9600 GTX	May; 27, 2009	G92	TSMC; 65 nm	754	324	PCIe; 2.0 x16	580	1450	700 (1400)	96:48:16:12	512	GDDR3	256	44.80	64	9.28	27.84	278.400	PureVideo 2 with VP2; Engine + BSP Engine & AES128	140	1x 6-Pin	?
GeForce 9800 GT	July; 21, 2008	G92-270-A2; G92-280-B1	TSMC; 65 nm 55 nm	754	324; 260	PCIe; 2.0 x16	600	1500	900 (1800)	112:56:16:14	512; 1024	GDDR3	256	57.0	64	9.60	33.60	336.000	PureVideo 2 with VP2; Engine + BSP Engine & AES128	125	1x 6-Pin	$159
GeForce 9800 GT Rebrand	July; 21, 2008	G92-270-A2	TSMC; 65 nm	754	324	PCIe; 2.0 x16	725	1750	1000 (2000)	128:64:16:16	512	GDDR3	256	64.00	64	11.60	46.40	448.000	PureVideo 2 with VP2; Engine + BSP Engine & AES128	125	1x 6-Pin	$159
GeForce 9800 GTX	March; 28, 2008	G92-420-A2	TSMC; 65 nm	754	324	PCIe; 2.0 x16	675	1688	1100 (2200)	128:64:16:16	512	GDDR3	256	70.40	64	10.80	43.20	432.128	PureVideo 2 with VP2; Engine + BSP Engine & AES128	140	2x 6-Pin	$299
GeForce 9800 GTX+	July 16, 2008	G92-420-B1	TSMC; 55 nm	754	260	PCIe; 2.0 x16	738	1836	1100 (2200)	128:64:16:16	512	GDDR3	256	70.40	64	11.81	47.23	470.016	PureVideo 2 with VP2; Engine + BSP Engine & AES128	141	2x 6-Pin	$229
GeForce 9800 GX2	March; 18, 2008	2× G92-450-A2	TSMC/UMC; 65 nm	2× 754	2× 324	PCIe; 2.0 x16	600	1500	1000 (2000)	2× 128:64:16:16	2× 512	GDDR3	2× 256	2× 64.00	2x 64	2× 9.60	2× 38.40	2× 384.000	PureVideo 2 with VP2; Engine + BSP Engine & AES128	197	1x 6-Pin + 1x 8-Pin	$599
Model	Launch Date	Code Name	Fab (nm)	Transistors (million)	Die Size (mm^{2})	Bus Interface	Core (MHz)	Shader (MHz)	Memory (MHz) (MT/s)	Core Config	Size (MB)	Bus Type	Bus Width (bit)	Bandwidth (GB/s)	Cache L2 (KB)	Pixel (GP/s)	Texture (GT/s)	Processing Power (GFLOPS)	Video Engine	TDP (Watts)	Power Connectors	MSRP USD
Model	Launch Date	Code Name	Fab (nm)	Transistors (million)	Die Size (mm^{2})	Bus Interface	Clock Rate			Core Config	Memory Configuration				Cache L2 (KB)	Fillrate		Processing Power (GFLOPS)	Video Engine	TDP (Watts)	Power Connectors	MSRP USD

== GeForce 100 series ==
- All models are OEM only and support Direct3D 11.1 (10_0), OpenGL 3.3, OpenCL 1.1, & CUDA 1.1.

Model	Launch Date	Code Name	Fab (nm)	Transistors (million)	Die Size (mm^{2})	Bus Interface	Clock Rate			Core Config	Memory Configuration				Cache L2 (KB)	Fillrate		Processing Power (GFLOPS)	TDP (Watts)	Power Connectors
Model	Launch Date	Code Name	Fab (nm)	Transistors (million)	Die Size (mm^{2})	Bus Interface	Core (MHz)	Shader (MHz)	Memory (MHz) (MT/s)	Core Config	Size (MB)	DRAM Type	Bus Width (bit)	Bandwidth (GB/s)	Cache L2 (KB)	Pixel (GP/s)	Texture (GT/s)	Processing Power (GFLOPS)	TDP (Watts)	Power Connectors
GeForce G 100 OEM	March; 10, 2009	G98-309-U2	UMC; 65 nm	210	86	PCIe; 2.0 x16	540	1300	400 (800)	8:4:4:1	256	DDR2	64	6.40	16	2.16		20.800	35	None
GeForce GT 120 OEM	March; 10, 2009	G96C	TSMC; 55 nm	314	121	PCIe; 2.0 x16	738	1836	504 (1008)	32:16:8:4	512	DDR2	128	16.13	32	5.90	11.81	117.504	50	None
GeForce GT 120 Mac Edition	January; 20, 2009	G96C	TSMC; 55 nm	314	121	PCIe; 2.0 x16	550	1400	800 (1600)	32:16:8:4	512	GDDR3	128	25.60	32	4.40	8.80	89.600	50	None
GeForce GT 130 OEM	March; 10, 2009	G94B	TSMC; 55 nm	505	196	PCIe; 2.0 x16	500	1250	500 (1000)	48:24:12:6	512	DDR2	192	24.00	48	6.00	12.00	120.000	75	1x 6-Pin
GeForce GT 130 Mac Edition	December; 12, 2008	G94B	TSMC; 55 nm	505	196	PCIe; 2.0 x16	600	1500	792 (1584)	48:24:12:6	512	GDDR3	192	38.02	48	7.20	14.40	144.000	75	1x 6-Pin
GeForce GT 140 OEM	March; 10, 2009	G94B	TSMC; 55 nm	505	196	PCIe; 2.0 x16	650	1625	900 (1800)	64:32:16:8	1024	GDDR3	256	57.60	64	10.40	20.80	208.000	105	1x 6-Pin
GeForce GTS 150 OEM	March; 10, 2009	G92	TSMC; 65 nm	754	324	PCIe; 2.0 x16	738	1836	1000 (2000)	128:64:16:16	1024	GDDR3	256	64.00	64	11.81	47.23	470.016	141	2x 6-Pin

== GeForce 200 series ==
- All models support Coverage Sample Anti-Aliasing, Angle-Independent Anisotropic Filtering, 240-bit OpenEXR HDR.
- All models support Direct3D 10.0 and OpenGL 3.3, except the GeForce 205, 210, 220, & GT 240, which support Direct3D 10.1 instead.
- Compute Capability: 1.1 (G92 [GTS250] GPU).
- Compute Capability: 1.2 (GT215, GT216, GT218 GPUs).
- Compute Capability: 1.3 has double precision support for use in GPGPU applications (GT200a/b GPUs only).

Model	Launch Date	Code Name	Fab (nm)	Transistors (million)	Die Size (mm^{2})	Bus Interface	Clock Rate			Core Config	Memory Configuration				Cache L2 (KB)	Fillrate		Processing Power (GFLOPS)		Video Engine	SLI	TDP (Watts)	Power Connectors	MSRP (USD)
Model	Launch Date	Code Name	Fab (nm)	Transistors (million)	Die Size (mm^{2})	Bus Interface	Core (MHz)	Shader (MHz)	Memory (MHz) (GT/s)	Core Config	Size (MB)	DRAM Type	Bus Width (bit)	Bandwidth (GB/s)	Cache L2 (KB)	Pixel (GP/s)	Texture (GT/s)	Single Precision FP32	Double Precision FP64 (1:8)	Video Engine	SLI	TDP (Watts)	Power Connectors	MSRP (USD)
GeForce 205 OEM	November; 26, 2009	GT218	TSMC; 40 nm	260	57	PCIe; 2.0 x16	589	1402	400 (0.8)	16:8:4:2	512	DDR2	64	6.4	32	2.36	4.71	44.864	—N/a	PureVideo 4 with VP4; Engine	No	30.5	None	OEM
GeForce 210 PCI	October; 12, 2009	GT216	TSMC; 40 nm	486	100	PCI	475	1100	400 (0.8)	16:8:4:2	512	DDR2	64	6.4	32	1.90	3.80	35.200	—N/a	PureVideo 4 with VP4; Engine	No	30.5	None	$29
GeForce 210	October; 12, 2009	GT218-300-A2	TSMC; 40 nm	260	57	PCIe; 2.0 x16	520	1230	400 (0.8)	16:8:4:2	512	DDR3	64	6.4	32	2.08	4.16	39.360	—N/a	PureVideo 4 with VP4; Engine	No	30.5	None	$29
GeForce 210 Rev. 2	October; 12, 2009	GT218-325-B1	TSMC; 40 nm	260	57	PCIe; 2.0 x16	520	1230	400 (0.8)	16:8:4:2	1024	DDR3	64	6.4	32	2.08	4.16	39.360	—N/a	PureVideo 4 with VP4; Engine	No	30.5	None	$29
GeForce 210 OEM	September; 4, 2009	GT216	TSMC; 40 nm	486	100	PCIe; 2.0 x16	475	1100	400 (0.8)	16:8:4:2	1024	DDR2	64	6.4	32	1.90	3.80	35.200	—N/a	PureVideo 4 with VP4; Engine	No	30.5	None	OEM
GeForce G210 OEM	May; 26, 2009	G96C	TSMC; 55 nm	314	121	PCIe; 1.0 x16	550	1350	504 (1.0)	16:8:4:2	512	DDR2	64	8.1	32	2.20	4.40	43.200	—N/a	PureVideo 4 with VP4; Engine	No	30.5	None	OEM
GeForce G210 OEM Rev. 2	August; 24, 2009	GT218-200-B1	TSMC; 40 nm	260	57	PCIe; 2.0 x16	589	1402	400 (0.8)	16:8:4:2	128	DDR2	64	6.4	32	2.36	4.71	44.864	—N/a	PureVideo 4 with VP4; Engine	No	30.5	None	OEM
GeForce G210 OEM Rev. 2	August; 24, 2009	GT218-200-B1	TSMC; 40 nm	260	57	PCIe; 2.0 x16	589	1402	400 (0.8)	16:8:4:2	128	GDDR3	64	6.4	32	2.36	4.71	44.864	—N/a	PureVideo 4 with VP4; Engine	No	30.5	None	OEM
GeForce G210 OEM Rev. 2	August; 24, 2009	GT218-200-B1	TSMC; 40 nm	260	57	PCIe; 2.0 x16	589	1402	400 (0.8)	16:8:4:2	256	DDR2	64	6.4	32	2.36	4.71	44.864	—N/a	PureVideo 4 with VP4; Engine	No	30.5	None	OEM
GeForce G210 OEM Rev. 2	August; 24, 2009	GT218-200-B1	TSMC; 40 nm	260	57	PCIe; 2.0 x16	589	1402	400 (0.8)	16:8:4:2	512	DDR2	64	6.4	32	2.36	4.71	44.864	—N/a	PureVideo 4 with VP4; Engine	No	30.5	None	OEM
GeForce G210 OEM Rev. 2	August; 24, 2009	GT218-200-B1	TSMC; 40 nm	260	57	PCIe; 2.0 x16	589	1402	400 (0.8)	16:8:4:2	512	DDR3	64	6.4	32	2.36	4.71	44.864	—N/a	PureVideo 4 with VP4; Engine	No	30.5	None	OEM
GeForce G210 OEM Rev. 2	August; 24, 2009	GT218-200-B1	TSMC; 40 nm	260	57	PCIe; 2.0 x16	589	1402	400 (0.8)	16:8:4:2	1024	DDR3	64	6.4	32	2.36	4.71	44.864	—N/a	PureVideo 4 with VP4; Engine	No	30.5	None	OEM
GeForce GT 220	October; 12, 2009	GT216-055-A3	TSMC; 40 nm	486	100	PCIe; 2.0 x16	625	1360	400 (0.8); 790 (1.58)	48:16:8:6	512; 1024	DDR2; GDDR3	128	12.8; 25.3	64	5.00	10.00	130.560	—N/a	PureVideo 4 with VP4; Engine	No	58	None	$49
GeForce GT 220	January; 26, 2010	G94	TSMC; 65 nm	505	240	PCIe; 2.0 x16	600	1500	700 (1.4)	48:24:8:6	1024	GDDR3	128	22.4	64	4.80	14.40	144.000	—N/a	PureVideo 4 with VP4; Engine	No	58	None	$49
GeForce GT 220 OEM	October; 12, 2009	GT215-450-A2	TSMC; 40 nm	727	144	PCIe; 2.0 x16	506	1012	700 (1.4)	48:16:8:6	512; 1024	GDDR3	128	22.4	64	4.05	8.10	97.152	—N/a	PureVideo 4 with VP4; Engine	No	58	None	OEM
GeForce GT 230	October; 12, 2009	G94-300-B1	TSMC; 55 nm	505	196	PCIe; 2.0 x16	650	1625	900 (1.8)	48:24:16:6	512; 1024	GDDR3	256	57.6	64	10.40	15.60	156.000	—N/a	PureVideo 4 with VP4; Engine	No	75	None	$44
GeForce GT 230 OEM	April 27, 2009	G92-159-B1	TSMC; 55 nm	754	260	PCIe; 2.0 x16	500	1250	500 (1.0)	96:48:12:12	1536	DDR2	192	24.0	48	6.00	18.00	240.000	—N/a	PureVideo 4 with VP4; Engine	No	75	None	OEM
GeForce GT 240	November; 17, 2009	GT215-450-A2	TSMC; 40 nm	727	144	PCIe; 2.0 x16	550	1340	850 (3.4)	96:32:8:12	1024	GDDR5	128	54.4	64	4.40	17.60	257.280	—N/a	PureVideo 4 with VP4; Engine	No	69	None	$79
GeForce GTS 240 OEM	July; 1, 2009	G92-240-B1	TSMC; 55 nm	754	260	PCIe; 2.0 x16	675	1620	1100 (2.2)	112:56:16:14	1024	GDDR3	256	70.4	64	10.80	37.80	362.880	—N/a	PureVideo 2 with VP2; Engine + BSP Engine & AES 240	3-Way	120	1x 6-Pin	OEM
GeForce GTS 250	March; 4, 2009	G92-426-B1	TSMC; 55 nm	754	260	PCIe; 2.0 x16	675	1620	1008 (2.0)	128:64:16:16	1024	GDDR3	256	64.5	64	10.80	43.20	414.720	—N/a	PureVideo 2 with VP2; Engine + BSP Engine & AES 240	3-Way	150	1x 6-Pin	$199
GeForce GTS 250	March; 4, 2009	G92-428-B1	TSMC; 55 nm	754	260	PCIe; 2.0 x16	702	1512	1000 (2.0)	128:64:16:16	1024	GDDR3	256	64.0	64	11.23	44.93	387.072	—N/a	PureVideo 2 with VP2; Engine + BSP Engine & AES 240	3-Way	150	1x 6-Pin	$199
GeForce GTX 260	June; 16, 2008	G200-100-A2	TSMC; 65 nm	1400	576	PCIe; 2.0 x16	576	1242	999 (2.0)	192:64:28:24	896	GDDR3	448	111.9	224	16.13	36.86	476.928	59.616	PureVideo 2 with VP2; Engine + BSP Engine & AES 240	3-Way	182	2x 6-Pin	$449
GeForce GTX 260 Rev. 2	July; 23, 2008	G200-103-B2	TSMC; 55 nm	1400	576	PCIe; 2.0 x16	576	1242	999 (2.0)	192:64:28:24	896	GDDR3	448	111.9	224	16.13	36.86	476.928	59.616	PureVideo 2 with VP2; Engine + BSP Engine & AES 240	3-Way	182	2x 6-Pin	$449
GeForce GTX 260 Core 216	September; 16, 2008	G200-103-A2	TSMC; 65 nm	1400	576	PCIe; 2.0 x16	576	1242	999 (2.0)	216:72:28:27	896	GDDR3	448	111.9	224	16.13	41.47	536.544	67.068	PureVideo 2 with VP2; Engine + BSP Engine & AES 240	3-Way	182	2x 6-Pin	$299
GeForce GTX 260 Core 216 Rev. 2	November; 27, 2008	G200-103-B2	TSMC; 55 nm	1400	576	PCIe; 2.0 x16	576	1242	999 (2.0)	216:72:28:27	896	GDDR3	448	111.9	224	16.13	41.47	536.544	67.068	PureVideo 2 with VP2; Engine + BSP Engine & AES 240	3-Way	171	2x 6-Pin	$299
GeForce GTX 260 OEM	December; 8, 2009	G200-101-A2	TSMC; 65 nm	1400	576	PCIe; 2.0 x16	518	1080	1008 (2.0)	192:64:28:24	1792	GDDR3	448	112.9	224	14.50	33.15	414.720	51.840	PureVideo 2 with VP2; Engine + BSP Engine & AES 240	3-Way	150	2x 6-Pin	OEM
GeForce GTX 275	January; 15, 2009	G200-105-B3	TSMC; 55 nm	1400	470	PCIe; 2.0 x16	633	1404	1134 (2.3)	240:80:28:30	896	GDDR3	448	127.0	224	17.72	50.64	673.920	84.240	PureVideo 2 with VP2; Engine + BSP Engine & AES 240	3-Way	219	2x 6-Pin	$249
GeForce GTX 275 PhysX Edition (Note: The GTX 275 PhysX Edition uses a modified GTS 250 core to handle the PhysX calculations, while the GTX 275 core handles the rest of the graphics.)	February; 16, 2010	G92-428-B1 + G200-105-B3	TSMC; 55 nm	754 + 1400	260 + 470	PCIe; 2.0 x16	738 + 633	1836 + 1296	1100 (2.2) + 1134 (2.3)	128:48:12:16 + 240:80:28:30	384 + 896	GDDR3	192 + 448	52.8 + 127.0	64 + 224	8.86 + 17.72	35.42 + 50.64	470.016 + 622.080	n/a + 77.760	PureVideo 2 with VP2; Engine + BSP Engine & AES 240	3-Way	219	1x 6-Pin + 1x 8-Pin	$349
GeForce GTX 280	June; 16, 2008	G200-300-A2	TSMC; 65 nm	1400	576	PCIe; 2.0 x16	602	1296	1107 (2.2)	240:80:32:30	1024	GDDR3	512	141.7	256	19.26	48.16	622.080	77.760	PureVideo 2 with VP2; Engine + BSP Engine & AES 240	3-Way	236	1x 6-Pin + 1x 8-Pin	$649
GeForce GTX 285	January; 15, 2009	GT200-350-B3	TSMC; 55 nm	1400	470	PCIe; 2.0 x16	648	1476	1242 (2.5)	240:80:32:30	1024	GDDR3	512	159.0	256	20.74	51.84	708.480	88.560	PureVideo 2 with VP2; Engine + BSP Engine & AES 240	3-Way (Note: 4-Way SLI is supported for the EVGA 285 Classified model.)	204	2x 6-Pin	$359
GeForce GTX 285 Mac Edition	January; 15, 2009	GT200-350-B3	TSMC; 55 nm	1400	470	PCIe; 2.0 x16	648	1476	1242 (2.5)	240:80:32:30	1024	GDDR3	512	159.0	256	20.74	51.84	708.480	88.560	PureVideo 2 with VP2; Engine + BSP Engine & AES 240	3-Way	204	2x 6-Pin	OEM
GeForce GTX 285 X2	June; 17, 2009	2x G200-350-B3	TSMC; 55 nm	1400	470	PCIe; 2.0 x16	648	1476	1152 (2.3)	2x 240:80:32:30	2x 2048	GDDR3	2x 512	2x 147.5	2x 256	2x 20.74	2x 51.84	2x 708.480	2x 88.560	PureVideo 2 with VP2; Engine + BSP Engine & AES 240	3-Way	315	2x 8-Pin	$1,399
GeForce GTX 295	January; 18, 2009	2× G200-400-B3	TSMC; 55 nm	2× 1400	2× 470	PCIe; 2.0 x16	576	1242	999 (2.0)	2× 240:80:28:30	2× 896	GDDR3	2× 448	111.9	2x 224	2× 16.13	2× 46.08	2x 596.160	2x 74.520	PureVideo 2 with VP2; Engine + BSP Engine & AES 240	3-Way	289	1x 6-Pin + 1x 8-Pin	$499
GeForce GTX 295 Single PCB	June; 16, 2009	2× G200-401-B3	TSMC; 55 nm	2× 1400	2× 470	PCIe; 2.0 x16	576	1242	1008 (2.0)	2× 240:80:28:30	2× 896	GDDR3	2× 448	112.9	2x 224	2× 16.13	2× 46.08	2x 596.160	2x 74.520	PureVideo 2 with VP2; Engine + BSP Engine & AES 240	3-Way	289	1x 6-Pin + 1x 8-Pin	$499
Model	Launch Date	Code Name	Fab (nm)	Transistors (million)	Die Size (mm^{2})	Bus Interface	Core (MHz)	Shader (MHz)	Memory (GT/s)	Core Config	Size (MB)	DRAM Type	Bus Width (bit)	Bandwidth (GB/s)	Cache L2 (KB)	Pixel (GP/s)	Texture (GT/s)	Single Precision FP32	Double Precision FP64 (1:8)	Video Engine	SLI	TDP (Watts)	Power Connectors	MSRP (USD)
Model	Launch Date	Code Name	Fab (nm)	Transistors (million)	Die Size (mm^{2})	Bus Interface	Clock Rate			Core Config	Memory Configuration				Cache L2 (KB)	Fillrate		Processing Power (GFLOPS)		Video Engine	SLI	TDP (Watts)	Power Connectors	MSRP (USD)

== GeForce 300 series ==
- All models are OEM only using no power connectors and support Direct3D 11.1 (10_1), OpenGL 3.3, & CUDA 1.2.

Model	Launch Date	Code Name	Fab (nm)	Transistors (million)	Die Size (mm^{2})	Bus Interface	Clock Rate			Core Config	Memory Configuration				Cache L2 (KB)	Fillrate		Processing Power (GFLOPS)	TDP (Watts)
Model	Launch Date	Code Name	Fab (nm)	Transistors (million)	Die Size (mm^{2})	Bus Interface	Core (MHz)	Shader (MHz)	Memory (MHz) (GT/s)	Core Config	Size (MB)	DRAM Type	Bus Width (bit)	Bandwidth (GB/s)	Cache L2 (KB)	Pixel (GP/s)	Texture (GT/s)	Processing Power (GFLOPS)	TDP (Watts)
GeForce 310	November; 27, 2009	GT218-300-A2	TSMC; 40 nm	260	57	PCIe; 2.0 x16	589	1402	333 (0.7)	16:8:4:2	512	DDR2	64	5.33	32	2.36	4.71	44.860	31
GeForce 315	February; 22, 2011	GT218-300-B1	TSMC; 40 nm	260	57	PCIe; 2.0 x16	589	1402	600 (1.2)	16:8:4:2	1024	DDR3	64	9.60	32	2.36	4.71	44.860	33
GeForce 315	April; 28, 2011	GT215-450-A2	TSMC; 40 nm	727	144	PCIe; 2.0 x16	506	1012	350 (0.7)	48:16:4:6	256	DDR2	64	5.60	32	2.02	8.10	97.150	33
GeForce 315	April; 28, 2011	GT215-450-A2	TSMC; 40 nm	727	144	PCIe; 2.0 x16	506	1012	350 (0.7)	48:16:4:6	512	DDR3	64	5.60	32	2.02	8.10	97.150	33
GeForce 315	April; 28, 2011	GT215-450-A2	TSMC; 40 nm	727	144	PCIe; 2.0 x16	506	1012	350 (0.7)	48:16:4:6	128	GDDR3	64	5.60	32	2.02	8.10	97.150	33
GeForce 315	March; 31, 2010	GT216	TSMC; 40 nm	486	100	PCIe; 2.0 x16	475	1100	790 (1.6)	48:16:8:6	512	DDR3	64	12.64	32	3.80	7.60	105.600	33
GeForce GT 320	February; 2, 2010	GT215-250-A2	TSMC; 40 nm	727	144	PCIe; 2.0 x16	540	1302	790 (1.6)	72:24:8:9	1024	GDDR3	128	25.28	64	4.32	12.96	187.500	43
GeForce GT 330	February; 2, 2010	GT215-301-A3	TSMC; 40 nm	727	144	PCIe; 2.0 x16	540	1304	790 (1.6)	96:32:8:12	1024	GDDR3	128	25.28	64	4.32	17.28	250.400	75
GeForce GT 330	February; 2, 2010	GT215-301-A3	TSMC; 40 nm	727	144	PCIe; 2.0 x16	550	1340	1000 (2.0)	96:32:8:12	512	GDDR3	128	32.00	64	4.40	17.60	257.300	75
GeForce GT 330	February; 2, 2010	G92	TSMC; 65 nm	754	324	PCIe; 2.0 x16	500	1250	800 (1.6)	96:48:8:12	1024	GDDR3	256	51.20	64	4.00	24.00	240.00	75
GeForce GT 330	February; 2, 2010	G92-168-B1	TSMC; 55 nm	754	260	PCIe; 2.0 x16	500	1250	510 (1.0)	96:48:16:12	256 512; 768 2048	DDR2	128	16.32	32	8.00	24.00	240.00	75
GeForce GT 340	February; 2, 2010	GT215-301-A3	TSMC; 40 nm	727	144	PCIe; 2.0 x16	550	1340	850 (1.7)	96:32:8:12	1024	GDDR3	128	27.20	64	4.40	17.60	257.300	69

== GeForce 400 series ==
- All models are built on the TSMC 40 nm process and support Vulkan 1.0, OpenGL 4.6, OpenCL 1.1, Direct3D 12 (11_0), & CUDA 2.1 except the GF-210 Cores, which lacks Vulkan (Note: OpenGL 3.3 ES (A subset of OpenGL 4.6) is required for Vulkan 1.0 support) support, supports OpenGL 3.3, Direct3D 11.1 (10_1), & CUDA 1.2 instead, and the GF-100 Cores, which supports CUDA 2.0 instead.

Model	Launch Date	Code Name	Transistors (million)	Die Size (mm^{2})	Bus Interface	Clock Rate			Core Config	Memory Configuration				Cache		Fillrate		Processing Power (GFLOPS)		TDP (Watts)	Power Connectors	MSRP (USD)
Model	Launch Date	Code Name	Transistors (million)	Die Size (mm^{2})	Bus Interface	Core (MHz)	Shader (MHz)	Memory (MHz) (GT/s)	Core Config	Size (MB)	DRAM Type	Bus Width (bit)	Bandwidth (GB/s)	L1 per SM (KB)	L2 (KB)	Pixel (GP/s)	Texture (GT/s)	Single Precision FP32	Double Precision FP64 (1:12)	TDP (Watts)	Power Connectors	MSRP (USD)
GeForce 405	September; 3, 2010	GT218-300-B1	260	57	PCIe; 2.0 x16	589	1402	790 (1.6)	16:8:4:2	512; 1024	DDR3	64	12.64	—N/a	32	2.36	4.71	44.860	—N/a	25	None	OEM
GeForce 405	September; 3, 2010	GT216	486	100	PCIe; 2.0 x16	475	1100	400 (0.8)	24:12:8:3	1024	DDR2	128	12.80	—N/a	32	3.80	5.70	52.800	—N/a	25	None	OEM
GeForce 405	September; 3, 2010	GT216	486	100	PCIe; 2.0 x16	475	1100	800 (1.6)	48:16:8:6	512; 1024	DDR3	64	12.80	—N/a	32	3.80	7.60	105.600	—N/a	25	None	OEM
GeForce GT 415 OEM	September; 3, 2010	GT216-305-A3	486	100	PCIe; 2.0 x16	625	1360	333 (666)	48:16:8:6	512; 1024	DDR3	128	10.66	—N/a	64	5.00	10.00	130.600	—N/a	32	None	OEM
GeForce GT 420 OEM	September; 3, 2010	GF108-200-A1	585	116	PCIe; 2.0 x16	700	1400	900 (1800)	48:4:4:1	1024	DDR3	128	28.80	64	256	2.80		134.400	11.200	50	None	OEM
GeForce GT 430	October; 11, 2010	GF108-300-A1	585	116	PCI	700	1400	600 (1.2)	96:16:4:2	512	DDR3	64	9.60	64	128	2.80	11.20	268.800	22.400	49	None	$79
GeForce GT 430	October; 11, 2010	GF108-300-A1	585	116	PCIe; 2.0 x16	700	1400	800 (1.6)	96:16:4:2	512; 1024	DDR3	64	12.80	64	128	2.80	11.20	268.800	22.400	49	None	$79
GeForce GT 430	October; 11, 2010	GF108-300-A1	585	116	PCIe; 2.0 x16	700	1400	800 (1.6)	96:16:4:2	1024; 2048; 4096	DDR3	128	25.60	64	128	2.80	11.20	268.800	22.400	49	None	$79
GeForce GT 430	October; 11, 2010	GF108-300-A1	585	116	PCIe; 2.0 x16	700	1400	800 (3.2)	96:16:4:2	1024	GDDR5	128	51.20	64	128	2.80	11.20	268.800	22.400	49	None	$79
GeForce GT 430 OEM	October; 11, 2010	GF108-400-A1	585	116	PCIe; 2.0 x16	700	1400	800 (1.6)	96:16:4:2	2048	DDR3	128	25.60	64	256	2.80	11.20	268.800	22.400	49	None	OEM
GeForce GT 440	February; 1, 2011	GF108-400-A1	585	116	PCIe; 2.0 x16	810	1620	900 (1.8)	96:16:4:2	1024; 2048	DDR3	128	28.80	64	256	3.24	12.96	311.000	25.920	65	None	$79
GeForce GT 440	February; 1, 2011	GF108-400-A1	585	116	PCIe; 2.0 x16	810	1620	900 (1.8)	96:16:4:2	256	GDDR3	128	28.80	64	256	3.24	12.96	311.000	25.920	65	None	$79
GeForce GT 440	February; 1, 2011	GF108-400-A1	585	116	PCIe; 2.0 x16	810	1620	900 (3.6)	96:16:4:2	512; 1024	GDDR5	128	57.60	64	256	3.24	12.96	311.000	25.920	65	None	$79
GeForce GT 440 Mac Edition	February; 9, 2011	GF108-400-A1	585	116	PCIe; 1.0 x16	810	1620	667 (1.3)	96:16:4:2	1024	DDR3	128	21.34	64	256	3.24	12.96	311.000	25.920	65	None	OEM
GeForce GT 440 OEM	October; 11, 2010	GF106	1170	238	PCIe; 2.0 x16	810	1620	900 (1.8)	144:24:24:3	1536	DDR3	192	43.20	64	384	19.44		466.600	38.880	65	None	OEM
GeForce GTS 450	September; 13, 2010	GF106-250-KA-A1	1170	238	PCIe; 2.0 x16	783	1566	902 (3.6)	192:32:16:4	1024	GDDR5	128	57.73	64	256	12.53	25.06	601.300	50.110	106	1x 6-Pin	$129
GeForce GTS 450 OEM	September; 13, 2010	GF106	1170	238	PCIe; 2.0 x16	783	1566	902 (3.6)	144:24:16:3	512	GDDR5	128	57.73	64	256	12.53	18.79	451.000	37.580	106	1x 6-Pin	OEM
GeForce GTS 450 OEM	October; 11, 2010	GF106-250-KB-A1	1170	238	PCIe; 2.0 x16	790	1580	1000 (4.0)	144:24:16:3	1536	GDDR5	192	96.00	64	384	12.64	18.96	455.000	37.920	106	1x 6-Pin	OEM
GeForce GTS 450 Rev. 2	March; 15, 2011	GF116-200-KA-A1	1170	238	PCIe; 2.0 x16	783	1566	902 (3.6)	192:32:16:4	1024	GDDR5	128	57.73	64	256	12.53	25.06	601.300	50.110	106	1x 6-Pin	$129
GeForce GTS 450 Rev. 3	July; 11, 2012	GF116-200-KA-A1	1170	238	PCIe; 2.0 x16	783	1566	700 (1.4)	144:24:16:3	1024	DDR3	128	22.40	64	256	12.53	18.79	451.000	37.580	106	2x 6-Pin	$129
GeForce GTX 460 SE	November; 15, 2010	GF104-225-A1	1950	332	PCIe; 2.0 x16	650	1300	850 (3.4)	288:48:32:6	1024	GDDR5	256	108.80	64	512	20.80	31.20	748.800	62.400	150	2x 6-Pin	$160
GeForce GTX 460 SE V2	November; 15, 2010	GF114-400-A1	1950	332	PCIe; 2.0 x16	650	1300	850 (3.4)	288:48:24:6	768	GDDR5	192	81.60	64	384	15.60	31.20	748.800	62.400	150	2x 6-Pin	$160
GeForce GTX 460	July; 12, 2010	GF104-300-KA-A1	1950	332	PCIe; 2.0 x16	675	1350	900 (3.6)	336:56:24:7	768	GDDR5	192	86.40	64	384	16.20	37.80	907.200	75.600	160	2x 6-Pin	$199
GeForce GTX 460	July; 12, 2010	GF104-300-KB-A1	1950	332	PCIe; 2.0 x16	675	1350	900 (3.6)	336:56:24:7	768	GDDR5	192	86.40	64	384	16.20	37.80	907.200	75.600	160	2x 6-Pin	$199
GeForce GTX 460	July; 12, 2010	GF104-325-A1	1950	332	PCIe; 2.0 x16	675	1350	900 (3.6)	336:56:32:7	1024	GDDR5	256	115.20	64	512	21.60	37.80	907.200	75.600	160	2x 6-Pin	$229
GeForce GTX 460 OEM	October; 11, 2010	GF104-325-A1	1950	332	PCIe; 2.0 x16	650	1300	850 (3.4)	336:56:32:7	1024	GDDR5	256	108.80	64	512	20.80	36.40	873.600	72.800	150	2x 6-Pin	OEM
GeForce GTX 460 V2	September; 24, 2011	GF114-400-A1	1950	332	PCIe; 2.0 x16	779	1557	1002 (4.0)	336:56:24:7	1024	GDDR5	192	96.19	64	384	18.70	43.62	1046.300	87.190	160	2x 6-Pin	$199
GeForce GTX 460 V2 E.S.	September; 24, 2011	GF114-400-A1	1950	332	PCIe; 2.0 x16	779	1557	1002 (4.0)	336:56:32:7	1280	GDDR5	256	128.30	64	512	24.93	43.62	1046.300	87.190	160	2x 6-Pin	—N/a
GeForce GTX 460 X2	March; 11, 2011	2x GF104-300-KB-A1	2x 1950	2x 332	PCIe; 2.0 x16	701	1401	900 (3.6)	2x 336:56:32:7	2x 1024	GDDR5	2x 256	2x 115.20	64	2x 512	2x 22.43	2x 39.26	2x 941.500	2x 78.460	160	2x 8-Pin	~$350
GeForce GTX 465	May; 31, 2010	GF100-030-A3	3100	529	PCIe; 2.0 x16	608	1215	802 (3.2)	352:44:32:11	1024	GDDR5	256	102.70	64	512	19.46	26.75	855.4	106.9	200	2x 6-Pin	$279
GeForce GTX 470	March; 26, 2010	GF100-275-A3	3100	529	PCIe; 2.0 x16	608	1215	837 (3.3)	448:56:40:14	1280	GDDR5	320	133.90	64	640	24.32	34.05	1088.600	136.100	215	2x 6-Pin	$349
GeForce GTX 480	March; 26, 2010	GF100-375-A3	3100	529	PCIe; 2.0 x16	701	1401	924 (3.7)	480:60:48:15	1536	GDDR5	384	177.40	64	768	33.65	42.06	1345.000	168.100	250	1x 6-Pin + 1x 8-Pin	$499
Model	Launch Date	Code Name	Transistors (million)	Die Size (mm^{2})	Bus Interface	Core (MHz)	Shader (MHz)	Memory (MHz) (GT/s)	Core Config	Size (MB)	DRAM Type	Bus Width (bit)	Bandwidth (GB/s)	L1 per SM (KB)	L2 (KB)	Pixel (GP/s)	Texture (GT/s)	Single Precision FP32	Double Precision FP64 (1:12)	TDP (Watts)	Power Connectors	MSRP (USD)
Model	Launch Date	Code Name	Transistors (million)	Die Size (mm^{2})	Bus Interface	Clock Rate			Core Config	Memory Configuration				Cache		Fillrate		Processing Power (GFLOPS)		TDP (Watts)	Power Connectors	MSRP (USD)

== GeForce 500 series ==
- All models are bult on the TSMC 40 nm process and supports Direct3D 12 (11_0), OpenGL 4.6, OpenCL 1.1, & CUDA 2.1 & lacks Vulkan, except for both 505 OEM models which supports Direct3D 11.1 (10_0), OpenGL 3.3, & CUDA 1.2 and the GF 110 Core models which supports CUDA 2.0 instead.

Model	Launch Date	Code Name	Transistors (million)	Die Size (mm^{2})	Bus Interface	Clock Rate			Core Config	Memory Configuration				Cache		Fillrate		Processing Power (GFLOPS)			TDP (Watts)	Power Connectors	MSRP (USD)
Model	Launch Date	Code Name	Transistors (million)	Die Size (mm^{2})	Bus Interface	Core (MHz)	Shader (MHz)	Memory (MHz) (GT/s)	Core Config	Size (MB)	DRAM Type	Bus Width (bit)	Bandwidth (GB/s)	L1 per SM (KB)	L2 (KB)	Pixel (GP/s)	Texture (GT/s)	Single Precision FP32	Double Precision FP64 (1:12)	Double Precision FP64 (1:8)	TDP (Watts)	Power Connectors	MSRP (USD)
GeForce 505 OEM	January; 6, 2013	GT218-300-B1	260	57	PCIe; 1.0 x16	589	1402	600 (1.2)	16:8:4:2	512; 1024	DDR3	64	9.60	—N/a	32	2.36	4.71	44.864	—N/a		25	None	OEM
GeForce 505 OEM	February; 17, 2013	GT216	486	100	PCIe; 1.0 x16	615	1031	700 (1.4)	24:12:8:3	1024	DDR3	128	22.40	—N/a	64	4.92	7.38	49.488	—N/a		25	None	OEM
GeForce 510 OEM	September; 29, 2011	GF119S	292	79	PCIe; 2.0 x16	523	1046	898 (1.8)	48:8:4:1	1024; 2048	DDR3	64	14.37	64	128	2.09	4.18	100.416	8.368	—N/a	25	None	OEM
GeForce GT 520	April; 13, 2011	GF119-300-A1	292	79	PCI	810	1620	900 (1.8)	48:8:4:1	1024	DDR3	64	14.40	64	128	3.24	6.48	155.520	12.960	—N/a	29	None	$59
GeForce GT 520	April; 13, 2011	GF119-300-A1	292	79	PCIe; 2.0 x16	810	1620	900 (1.8)	48:8:4:1	1024	DDR3	64	14.40	64	128	3.24	6.48	155.520	12.960	—N/a	29	None	$59
GeForce GT 520	April; 13, 2011	GF119-300-A1	292	79	PCIe; 2.0 x1	810	1620	900 (1.8)	48:8:4:1	1024; 2048	DDR3	64	14.40	64	128	3.24	6.48	155.520	12.960	—N/a	29	None	$59
GeForce GT 520 OEM	August; 20, 2012	GF119S	292	79	PCIe; 2.0 x16	589	1402	500 (1.0)	48:8:4:2	1024	DDR3	64	8.00	64	128	2.36	4.71	134.592	11.216	—N/a	29	None	OEM
GeForce GT 520 OEM	February; 1, 2012	GF108-200-A1	585	116	PCIe; 2.0 x16	700	1400	667 (1.3)	48:8:4:1	1024; 2048	DDR3	64	10.67	64	128	2.80	5.60	134.400	11.200	—N/a	29	None	OEM
GeForce GT 530 OEM	May; 14, 2011	GF108-200-A1	585	116	PCIe; 2.0 x16	700	1400	900 (1.8)	96:16:4:2	1024; 2048	DDR3	128	28.80	64	256	2.80	11.20	268.800	22.400	—N/a	50	None	OEM
GeForce GT 545	May; 14, 2011	GF116	1170	238	PCIe; 2.0 x16	720	1440	800 (1.6)	144:24:16:3	1536; 3072	DDR3	192	38.40	64	384	11.52	17.28	414.720	34.560	—N/a	70	None	$149
GeForce GT 545 OEM	May; 14, 2011	GF116-110-KA-A1	1170	238	PCIe; 2.0 x16	871	1741	1000 (4.0)	144:24:16:3	1024	GDDR5	128	64.00	64	256	13.94	20.90	501.408	41.784	—N/a	105	1x 6-Pin	OEM
GeForce GTX 550 Ti	March; 15, 2011	GF116-400-A1	1170	238	PCIe; 2.0 x16	900	1800	1026 (4.1)	192:32:24:4	1024	GDDR5	192 (Note: 1024 MB on a 192-bit bus split as 4x (128 MB) + 2x (256 MB).)	98.50	64	384	21.60	28.80	691.200	57.600	—N/a	116	1x 6-Pin	$149
GeForce GTX 555 OEM	May; 14, 2011	GF114-200-KB-A1	1950	332	PCIe; 2.0 x16	736	1472	957 (3.8)	288:48:24:6	1024	GDDR5	192	91.87	64	384	17.66	35.33	847.872	70.656	—N/a	150	2x 6-Pin	OEM
GeForce GTX 560 SE	February; 20, 2012	GF114-200-KB-A1	1950	332	PCIe; 2.0 x16	736	1472	957 (3.8)	288:48:24:6	1024	GDDR5	192	91.87	64	384	17.66	35.33	847.872	70.656	—N/a	150	2x 6-Pin	$149
GeForce GTX 560	May; 17, 2011	GF114-325-A1	1950	332	PCIe; 2.0 x16	810	1620	1000 (4.0)	336:56:32:7	1024	GDDR5	256	128.00	64	512	25.92	45.36	1088.640	90.720	—N/a	150	2x 6-Pin	$199
GeForce GTX 560 OEM	November; 29, 2011	GF110-040-A1	3000	520	PCIe; 2.0 x16	552	1104	802 (3.2)	384:48:40:12	1280	GDDR5	320	128.30	64	640	22.08	26.50	847.872	—N/a	105.984	150	1x 6-Pin	OEM
GeForce GTX 560 Ti	January; 25, 2011	GF114-400-A1	1950	332	PCIe; 2.0 x16	823	1645	1002 (4.0)	384:64:32:8	1024	GDDR5	256	128.30	64	512	26.34	52.67	1236.360	105.280	—N/a	170	2x 6-Pin	$249
GeForce GTX 560 Ti OEM	March; 8, 2011	GF114-400-A1	1950	332	PCIe; 2.0 x16	823	1645	1002 (4.0)	384:64:32:8	1024	GDDR5	256	128.30	64	512	26.34	52.67	1236.360	105.280	—N/a	170	2x 6-Pin	OEM
GeForce GTX 560 Ti OEM	March; 30, 2011	GF110	3000	520	PCIe; 2.0 x16	732	1464	950 (3.8)	352:44:40:11	1280	GDDR5	256	128.80	64	512	29.28	32.21	1030.656	—N/a	128.832	210	2x 6-Pin	OEM
GeForce GTX 560 Ti 448	November; 29, 2011	GF110-270-A1	3000	520	PCIe; 2.0 x16	732	1464	950 (3.8)	448:56:40:14	1280	GDDR5	320	152.00	64	640	29.28	40.99	1311.744	—N/a	163.968	210	2x 6-Pin	$289
GeForce GTX 560 Ti X2	January; 25, 2011	2x GF114-400-A1	2x 1950	2x 332	PCIe; 2.0 x16	850	1700	1002 (4.0)	2x 384:64:32:8	2x 1024	GDDR5	2x 256	2x 128.30	64	2x 512	2x 27.20	2x 54.40	2x 1305.600	2x 108.800	—N/a	170	2x 8-Pin	$519
GeForce GTX 570	December; 7, 2010	GF110-275-A1	3000	520	PCIe; 2.0 x16	732	1464	950 (3.8)	480:60:40:15	1280	GDDR5	320	152.00	64	640	29.28	43.92	1405.440	—N/a	175.680	219	2x 6-Pin	$349
GeForce GTX 570 Rev. 2	December; 7, 2010	GF110-275-A1	3000	520	PCIe; 2.0 x16	732	1464	950 (3.8)	480:60:40:15	1280	GDDR5	320	152.00	64	640	29.28	43.92	1405.440	—N/a	175.680	219	2x 6-Pin	$349
GeForce GTX 580	November; 9, 2010	GF110-375-A1	3000	520	PCIe; 2.0 x16	772	1544	1002 (4.0)	512:64:48:16	1536	GDDR5	384	192.40	64	768	37.06	49.41	1581.056	—N/a	197.632	244	1x 6-Pin + 1x 8-Pin	$499
GeForce GTX 580 Rev. 2	June; 6, 2011	GF110-380-A1	3000	520	PCIe; 2.0 x16	772	1544	1002 (4.0)	512:64:48:16	1536	GDDR5	384	192.40	64	768	37.06	49.41	1581.056	—N/a	197.632	244	1x 6-Pin + 1x 8-Pin	$499
GeForce GTX 590	March; 24, 2011	2x GF110-351-A1	2x 3000	2x 520	PCIe; 2.0 x16	608	1215	854 (3.4)	2x 512:64:48:16	2x 1536	GDDR5	2x 384	2x 164.00	64	2x 768	2x 29.18	2x 38.91	2x 1244.160	—N/a	2x 155.520	365	2x 2x 8-Pin	$699
Model	Launch Date	Code Name	Transistors (million)	Die Size (mm^{2})	Bus Interface	Core (MHz)	Shader (MHz)	Memory (MHz) (GT/s)	Core Config	Size (MB)	DRAM Type	Bus Width (bit)	Bandwidth (GB/s)	L1 per SM (KB)	L2 (KB)	Pixel (GP/s)	Texture (GT/s)	Single Precision FP32	Double Precision FP64 (1:12)	Double Precision FP64 (1:8)	TDP (Watts)	Power Connectors	MSRP (USD)
Model	Launch Date	Code Name	Transistors (million)	Die Size (mm^{2})	Bus Interface	Clock Rate			Core Config	Memory Configuration				Cache		Fillrate		Processing Power (GFLOPS)			TDP (Watts)	Power Connectors	MSRP (USD)

== GeForce 600 series ==
- All models support Direct3D 12 (11_0) & OpenGL 4.6.
- All GF core models support OpenCL 1.1 & CUDA 2.1
- All GK core models support OpenCL 3.0 & Vulkan 1.2.175.
- All GK100 core models support CUDA 3.0.
- All GK200 core models support CUDA 3.5.

Model	Launch Date	Code Name	Fab (nm)	Transistors (million)	Die Size (mm^{2})	Bus Interface	Clock Rate			Core Config	Memory Configuration				Cache		Fillrate		Processing Power (GFLOPS)			TDP (Watts)	Power Connectors	MSRP (USD)
Model	Launch Date	Code Name	Fab (nm)	Transistors (million)	Die Size (mm^{2})	Bus Interface	Core (MHz) (Boost)	Shader (MHz) (Boost)	Memory (MHz) (GT/s)	Core Config	Size (MB)	DRAM Type	Bus Width (bit)	Bandwidth (GB/s)	L1 per SM(X) (KB)	L2 (KB)	Pixel (GP/s)	Texture (GT/s)	Single Precision FP32	Double Precision FP64 (1:12)	Double Precision FP64 (1:24)	TDP (Watts)	Power Connectors	MSRP (USD)
GeForce 605 OEM	April; 2, 2012	GF119-200-A1	TSMC; 40 nm	292	79	PCIe; 2.0 x16	523	1046	897 (1.8)	48:8:4:1	512; 1024	DDR3	64	14.35	64	128	2.09	4.18	100.416	8.368	—N/a	25	None	OEM
GeForce GT 610	April; 2, 2012	GF119-300-A1	TSMC; 40 nm	292	79	PCI	810	1620	667 (1.3)	48:8:4:1	512	DDR3	64	10.67	64	128	3.24	6.48	155.520	12.960	—N/a	29	None	$49
GeForce GT 610	April; 2, 2012	GF119-300-A1	TSMC; 40 nm	292	79	PCIe; 2.0 x1	810	1620	500 (1.0)	48:8:4:1	512	DDR3	64	8.00	64	128	3.24	6.48	155.520	12.960	—N/a	29	None	$49
GeForce GT 610	April; 2, 2012	GF119-300-A1	TSMC; 40 nm	292	79	PCIe; 2.0 x16	810	1620	898 (1.8)	48:8:4:1	1024	DDR3	64	14.37	64	128	3.24	6.48	155.520	12.960	—N/a	29	None	$49
GeForce GT 610 OEM	September; 9, 2012	GF119S	TSMC; 40 nm	292	79	PCIe; 2.0 x16	550	1200	500 (1.0)	48:8:4:2	1024	DDR3	64	8.00	64	128	2.20	4.40	115.200	9.600	—N/a	29	None	OEM
GeForce GT 610 OEM	April; 2, 2016	GF108	TSMC; 40 nm	585	116	PCIe; 2.0 x16	701	1402	500 (1.0)	48:8:4:1	2048	DDR3	64	8.00	64	128	2.80	5.60	134.592	11.216	—N/a	29	None	OEM
GeForce 615 OEM	May; 15, 2012	GF108	TSMC; 40 nm	585	116	PCIe; 2.0 x16	660	1320	900 (1.8)	48:8:4:1	1024	DDR3	128	28.80	64	256	2.64	5.28	126.720	10.560	—N/a	49	None	OEM
GeForce GT 620	May; 15, 2012	GF108-100-KB-A1	TSMC; 40 nm	585	116	PCIe; 2.0 x16	700	1400	900 (1.8)	96:16:4:2	1024	DDR3	64	14.40	64	128	2.80	11.20	268.800	22.400	—N/a	49	None	$59
GeForce GT 620 OEM	April; 2, 2012	GF119S	TSMC; 40 nm	292	79	PCIe; 2.0 x16	810	1620	898 (1.8)	48:8:4:1	512; 1024	DDR3	64	14.37	64	128	3.24	6.48	155.520	12.960	—N/a	30	None	OEM
GeForce GT 625 OEM	February; 18, 2013	GF119-400-A1	TSMC; 40 nm	292	79	PCIe; 2.0 x16	874	1748	825 (1.7)	48:8:4:1	1024	DDR3	64	13.20	64	128	3.50	6.99	167.808	13.984	—N/a	29	None	OEM
GeForce GT 630	May; 15, 2012	GF108-400-A1	TSMC; 40 nm	585	116	PCIe; 2.0 x16	810	1620	900 (1.8)	96:16:4:2	1024	DDR3	128	28.80	64	256	3.24	12.96	311.040	25.920	—N/a	65	None	$79
GeForce GT 630 Rev. 2	May; 29, 2013	GK208-301-A1	TSMC; 28 nm	1020	87	PCIe; 2.0 x8	902		900 (1.8)	384:32:8:2	2048	DDR3	64	14.40	16	512	7.22	28.86	692.736	—N/a	28.864	25	None	$79
GeForce GT 630 OEM	April; 24, 2012	GK107-301-A2	TSMC; 28 nm	1270	118	PCIe; 3.0 x16	875		891 (1.8)	192:16:16:1	1024; 2048	DDR3	128	28.51	16	256	14.00		336.000	—N/a	14.000	50	None	OEM
GeForce GT 635 OEM	October; 1, 2013	GK208	TSMC; 28 nm	1020	87	PCIe; 3.0 x8	967		900 (1.8)	384:32:8:2	1024	DDR3	64	14.40	16	512	7.74	30.94	742.656	—N/a	30.944	35	None	OEM
GeForce GT 640	June; 5, 2012	GK107-300-A2	TSMC; 28 nm	1270	118	PCIe; 3.0 x16	902		891 (1.8)	384:32:16:2	2048	DDR3	128	28.51	16	256	7.22	28.86	692.736	—N/a	28.864	65	None	$99
GeForce GT 640 Rev. 2	May; 29, 2013	GK208-400-A1	TSMC; 28 nm	1020	87	PCIe; 2.0 x8	1046		1252 (5.0)	384:32:8:2	1024	GDDR5	64	40.06	16	512	16.74	33.47	803.328	—N/a	33.472	49	None	$89
GeForce GT 640 OEM	April; 24, 2012	GK107-320-A2	TSMC; 28 nm	1270	118	PCIe; 3.0 x16	797		891 (1.8)	384:32:16:2	2048; 4096	DDR3	128	28.51	16	256	12.75	25.50	612.096	—N/a	25.504	50	None	OEM
GeForce GT 640 OEM	April; 24, 2012	GK107-320-A2	TSMC; 28 nm	1270	118	PCIe; 3.0 x16	797		891 (3.6)	384:32:16:2	1024	GDDR5	128	57.02	16	256	12.75	25.50	612.096	—N/a	25.504	50	None	OEM
GeForce GT 640 OEM Rebrand	April; 24, 2012	GF116-150-A1	TSMC; 40 nm	1170	238	PCIe; 2.0 x16	720	1440	800 (1.6)	144:24:24:3	1536	DDR3	192	38.40	64	384	17.28		414.720	34.560	—N/a	75	None	OEM
GeForce GT 645 OEM	April; 24, 2012	GF114	TSMC; 40 nm	1950	332	PCIe; 2.0 x16	776	1552	957 (3.8)	288:48:24:6	1024 (Note: 1024 MB on a 192-bit bus split as 4x (128 MB) + 2x (256 MB) or 2048 MB on a 192-bit bus split as 8x (128 MB) + 4x (256 MB).); 1536	GDDR5	192	91.87	64	384	18.62	37.25	893.952	74.496	—N/a	102	1x 6-Pin	OEM
GeForce GTX 645 OEM	April; 22, 2013	GK106-200-A1	TSMC; 28 nm	2540	221	PCIe; 3.0 x16	824		1000 (4.0)	576:48:16:3	1024	GDDR5	128	64.00	16	256	13.18	39.55	949.248	—N/a	39.552	65	None	OEM
GeForce GTX 650	September; 6, 2012	GK107-450-A2	TSMC; 28 nm	1270	118	PCIe; 3.0 x16	1058		1250 (5.0)	384:32:16:2	1024	GDDR5	128	80.00	16	256	16.93	33.86	812.554	—N/a	33.856	65	1x 6-Pin	$109
GeForce GTX 650	November; 27, 2013	GK106	TSMC; 28 nm	2540	221	PCIe; 3.0 x16	1058		1250 (5.0)	384:32:16:2	1024	GDDR5	128	80.00	16	256	16.93	33.86	812.554	—N/a	33.856	65	1x 6-Pin	$109
GeForce GTX 650 Ti	October; 9, 2012	GK106-220-A1	TSMC; 28 nm	2540	221	PCIe; 3.0 x16	928		1350 (5.4)	768:64:16:4	1024	GDDR5	128	86.40	16	256	14.85	59.39	1,425.408	—N/a	59.392	110	1x 6-Pin	$149
GeForce GTX 650 Ti OEM	March; 31, 2013	GK106	TSMC; 28 nm	2540	221	PCIe; 3.0 x16	928		1350 (5.4)	768:64:16:4	2048	GDDR5	128	86.40	16	256	14.85	59.39	1,425.408	—N/a	59.392	110	1x 6-Pin	OEM
GeForce GTX 650 Ti Boost	March; 26, 2013	GK106-240-A1	TSMC; 28 nm	2540	221	PCIe; 3.0 x16	980 (1032)		1502 (6.0)	768:64:24:4	2048	GDDR5	192	144.20	16	384	23.52 (24.77)	62.72 (66.05)	1,505.280 (1,585.152)	—N/a	62.720 (66.048)	134	1x 6-Pin	$169
GeForce GTX 660	September; 6, 2012	GK106-400-A1	TSMC; 28 nm	2540	221	PCIe; 3.0 x16	980 (1032)		1502 (6.0)	960:80:24:5	2048	GDDR5	192	144.20	16	384	23.52 (24.77)	62.72 (66.05)	1,505.280 (1,585.152)	—N/a	62.720 (66.048)	140	1x 6-Pin	$229
GeForce GTX 660 Rev. 2	September; 13, 2014	GK104	TSMC; 28 nm	3540	294	PCIe; 3.0 x16	980 (1032)		1502 (6.0)	960:80:24:5	2048	GDDR5	192	144.20	16	384	23.52 (24.77)	62.72 (66.05)	1,505.280 (1,585.152)	—N/a	62.720 (66.048)	140	1x 6-Pin	$229
GeForce GTX 660 OEM	August; 22, 2012	GK104-200-KD-A2	TSMC; 28 nm	3540	294	PCIe; 3.0 x16	823 (888)		1400 (5.6)	1152:96:24:6	1536; 3072	GDDR5	192	134.40	16	384	19.75 (21.31)	79.01 (88.25)	1,896.192 (2,045.952)	—N/a	79.008 (85.248)	130	1x 6-Pin	OEM
GeForce GTX 660 OEM	August; 22, 2012	GK104-200-KD-A2	TSMC; 28 nm	3540	294	PCIe; 3.0 x16	823 (888)		1400 (5.6)	1152:96:24:6	2048	GDDR5	256	179.20	16	512	19.75 (21.31)	79.01 (88.25)	1,896.192 (2,045.952)	—N/a	79.008 (85.248)	130	1x 6-Pin	OEM
GeForce GTX 660 Ti	August; 16, 2012	GK104-300-KD-A2	TSMC; 28 nm	3540	294	PCIe; 3.0 x16	915 (980)		1502 (6.0)	1344:112:24:7	2048	GDDR5	192	144.20	16	384	21.96 (23.52)	102.48 (109.76)	2,459.520 (2,634.240)	—N/a	102.480 (109.760)	150	2x 6-Pin	$299
GeForce GTX 670	May; 10, 2012	GK104-325-A2	TSMC; 28 nm	3540	294	PCIe; 3.0 x16	915 (980)		1502 (6.0)	1344:112:32:7	2048	GDDR5	256	192.30	16	512	29.28 (31.36)	102.48 (109.76)	2,459.520 (2,634.240)	—N/a	102.480 (109.760)	170	2x 6-Pin	$399
GeForce GTX 680	March; 22, 2012	GK104-400-A2	TSMC; 28 nm	3540	294	PCIe; 3.0 x16	1006 (1058)		1502 (6.0)	1536:128:32:8	2048	GDDR5	256	192.30	16	512	32.19 (33.86)	128.77 (135.42)	3090.432 (3,250.176)	—N/a	128.768 (135.424)	195	2x 6-Pin	$499
GeForce GTX 680 Mac Edition (Note: When used on MacOS, only OpenGL 3.2 is supported, instead of 4.6 when used on Windows.)	April; 3, 2013	GK104-400-A2	TSMC; 28 nm	3540	294	PCIe; 2.0 x16	1006 (1058)		1502 (6.0)	1536:128:32:8	2048	GDDR5	256	192.30	16	512	32.19 (33.86)	128.77 (135.42)	3090.432 (3,250.176)	—N/a	128.768 (135.424)	195	2x 6-Pin	OEM
GeForce GTX 690	May; 3, 2012	2x GK104-355-A2	TSMC; 28 nm	2x 2540	2x 294	PCIe; 3.0 x16	915 (1019)		1502 (6.0)	2x 1536:128:32:8	2x 2048	GDDR5	2x 256	2x 192.30	16	2x 512	2x 29.280; 2x (32.608)	2x 117.12; 2x (130.43)	2x 2,810.880; 2x (3,130.368)	—N/a	2x 117.120; 2x (130.432)	300	2x 8-Pin	$999
Model	Launch Date	Code Name	Fab (nm)	Transistors (million)	Die Size (mm^{2})	Bus Interface	Core (MHz) (Boost)	Shader (MHz) (Boost)	Memory (MHz) (GT/s)	Core Config	Size (MB)	DRAM Type	Bus Width (bit)	Bandwidth (GB/s)	L1 per SM(X) (KB)	L2 (KB)	Pixel (GP/s)	Texture (GT/s)	Single Precision FP32	Double Precision FP64 (1:12)	Double Precision FP64 (1:24)	TDP (Watts)	Power Connectors	MSRP (USD)
Model	Launch Date	Code Name	Fab (nm)	Transistors (million)	Die Size (mm^{2})	Bus Interface	Clock Rate			Core Config	Memory Configuration				Cache		Fillrate		Processing Power (GFLOPS)			TDP (Watts)	Power Connectors	MSRP (USD)

== GeForce 700 series ==
- All GM107-chips are Maxwell-based, all GF1xx are Fermi-based, and all GKxxx-chips are Kepler-based.
- Many models are rebranded cards from previous generations.
- API Support:
  - All models support Direct3D 12 (11_0). OpenGL 4.6.
  - Vulkan: Maxwell chips support 1.3, Kepler chips support 1.2, & Fermi lacks support.
  - OpenCL: Maxwell and Kepler chips support 3.0, while Fermi chips only support 1.1.
- GTX TITAN class cards use Double precision 1:3 instead of 1:24 or 1:32 found on other GTX 700 series cards.

Model	Launch Date	Code Name	Fab (nm)	Transistors (million)	Die Size (mm^{2})	Bus Interface	Clock Rate			Core Config	Memory Configuration				Cache		Fillrate		Processing Power (GFLOPS)		TDP (Watts)	Power Connectors	MSRP (USD)
Model	Launch Date	Code Name	Fab (nm)	Transistors (million)	Die Size (mm^{2})	Bus Interface	Core (Boost) (MHz)	Shader (Boost) (MHz)	Memory (MHz) (MT/s)	Core Config	Size (GB)	DRAM Type	Bus Width (bit)	Bandwidth (GB/s)	L1 per SM(X)/(M) (KB)	L2 (KB)	Pixel (GP/s)	Texture (GT/s)	Single Precision	Double Precision	TDP (Watts)	Power Connectors	MSRP (USD)
GeForce GT 705 OEM	March; 27, 2014	GF119-400-A1	TSMC; 40 nm	292	79	PCIe 2x16	874	1748	825 (1650)	48:8:4:1	1	DDR3	64	13.2	64	128	1.748	6.992	167.8	13.98	29	None	OEM
GeForce GT 710 OEM	March; 27, 2014	GK208B	TSMC; 28HP	1020	87	PCIe 2x8	797		900 (1800)	192:16:8:1	1	DDR3	64	14.4	16	512	3.188	12.75	306.0	12.75	?	None	OEM
GeForce GT 710	March; 27, 2014	GK208-203-B1	TSMC; 28HP	1020	87	PCIe 2x1	954		800 (1600)	192:16:8:1	1	DDR3	64	12.8	16	512	3.816	15.26	366.3	15.26	19	None	$35
GeForce GT 710	March; 27, 2014	GK208-203-B1	TSMC; 28HP	1020	87	PCIe 2x8	954		900 (1800)	192:16:8:1	2	DDR3	64	14.4	16	512	3.816	15.26	366.3	15.26	19	None	$35
GeForce GT 710	January; 26, 2016	GF119-300-A1	TSMC; 40 nm	292	79	PCIe 2x16	810	1620	898 (1796)	48:8:4:1	1	DDR3	64	14.37	64	128	1.62	6.48	155.5	12.96	29	None	$35
GeForce GT 720 OEM	October; 29, 2017	GK107	TSMC; 28HP	1270	118	PCIe 3x16	993		891 (1782)	192:16:16:1	1	DDR3	128	28.51	16	256	3.972	15.89	381.3	15.89	50	None	OEM
GeForce GT 720	September; 29, 2014	GK208B	TSMC; 28HP	1020	87	PCIe 2x8	797		800 (1600)	192:16:8:1	1	DDR3	64	12.8	16	512	3.188	12.75	306.0	12.75	19	None	$49
GeForce GT 730 OEM	April; 9, 2015	GK107	TSMC; 28HP	1270	118	PCIe 3x16	902		1253 (5012)	384:32:8:2	1	GDDR5	64	40.1	16	128	7.216	28.86	692.7	28.9	64	1x 6-Pin	OEM
GeForce GT 730	June; 18, 2014	GK208-302-B1	TSMC; 28HP	1020	87	PCIe 2x8	902		1253 (5012)	384:32:8:2	1	GDDR5	64	40.1	16	512	7.216	28.86	692.7	28.9	38	None	$69
GeForce GT 730	June; 18, 2014	GF108-400-A1	TSMC; 40 nm	585	116	PCIe 2x16	700	1400	900 (1800)	96:16:4:2	1	DDR3	128	28.8	64	256	2.8	11.2	268.8	22.4	49	None	$69
GeForce GT 730	June; 18, 2014	GF108-400-A1	TSMC; 40 nm	585	116	PCIe 2x16	700	1400	800 (1600)	96:16:4:2	2	DDR3	128	25.6	64	256	2.8	11.2	268.8	22.4	49	None	$69
GeForce GT 740 OEM	April; 14 2015	GK106S	TSMC; 28HP	2540	221	PCIe 3x16	1006		1253 (5012)	384:32:16:2	1	GDDR5	128	80.19	64	256	8.084	32.19	772.6	32.19	65	None	OEM
GeForce GT 740 OEM	April; 14 2015	GK106S	TSMC; 28HP	2540	221	PCIe 3x16	980 (1033)		1253 (5012)	384:32:16:2	1	GDDR5	128	80.19	64	256	7.84 (8.264)	31.36 (33.06)	752.6 (793.3)	31.36 (33.06)	65	None	OEM
GeForce GT 740	May; 29, 2014	GK107-425-A2	TSMC; 28HP	1270	118	PCIe 3x16	993		1253 (5012)	384:32:16:2	1	GDDR5	128	80.19	16	256	7.99	31.78	762.6	31.78	64	1x 6-Pin	$89
GeForce GTX 745 OEM	February; 18, 2014	GM107-220-A2	TSMC; 28HP	1870	148	PCIe 3x16	1033		900 (1800)	384:24:16:3	4	DDR3	128	28.8	64	2048	16.53	24.79	793.3	24.79	55	None	OEM
GeForce GTX 750	February; 18, 2014	GM107-300-A2	TSMC; 28HP	1870	148	PCIe 3x16	1020 (1085)		1253 (5012)	512:32:16:4	1	GDDR5	128	80.19	64	2048	16.32 (17.36)	32.64 (34.72)	1,044.4 (1,111.0)	32.64 (34.72)	55	None	$119
GeForce GTX 750	November; 17, 2015	GM206	TSMC; 28HP	2940	228	PCIe 3x16	1087 (1239)		1253 (5012)	512:32:32:4	2	GDDR5	128	80.19	48	1024	34.79 (39.65)	34.79 (39.65)	1,113.1 (1,268.7)	34.79 (39.65)	60	None	$149
GeForce GTX 750 Ti OEM	February; 18, 2014	GK106	TSMC; 28HP	2540	221	PCIe 3x16	1033 (1098)		1502 (6008)	960:80:24:5	2	GDDR5	256	192.3	16	512	20.66 (21.96)	82.64 (87.84)	1,983.2 (2,108.2)	82.64 (87.84)	60	None	OEM
GeForce GTX 750 Ti	February; 18, 2014	GM107-400-A2	TSMC; 28HP	1870	148	PCIe 3x16	1020 (1085)		1350 (5400)	640:40:16:5	2	GDDR5	128	86.4	64	2048	16.32 (17.36)	40.8 (43.4)	1,305.6 (1,388.8)	40.8 (43.4)	60	None	$149
GeForce GTX 760 OEM	June; 27, 2013	GK104-200-KD-A2	TSMC; 28HP	3540	294	PCIe 3x16	823 (888)		1400 (5600)	1152:96:24:6	1.5	GDDR5	192	134.4	16	384	19.75 (21.31)	79 (85.25)	1,896.2 (2,046.0)	79 (85.25)	130	1x 6-Pin	OEM
GeForce GTX 760 OEM (Rebrand)	August; 25, 2013	GK104-200-KD-A2	TSMC; 28HP	3540	294	PCIe 3x16	823 (888)		1400 (5600)	1152:96:32:6	1.5	GDDR5	256	179.2	16	512	26.34 (28.42)	79 (85.25)	1,896.2 (2,046.0)	79 (85.25)	130	1x 6-Pin	OEM
GeForce GTX 760 OEM (Core 1344)	November; 6, 2016	GK104-200-KD-A2	TSMC; 28HP	3540	294	PCIe 3x16	993 (1046)		1650 (6600)	1344:112:32:7	2	GDDR5	256	211.2	16	512	27.81 (29.29)	111.26 (117.2)	2,669.5 (2,811.6)	111.26 (117.2)	170	2x 6-Pin	OEM
GeForce GTX 760	June; 25, 2013	GK104-225-A2	TSMC; 28HP	3540	294	PCIe 3x16	980 (1032)		1502 (6008)	1152:96:32:6	2	GDDR5	256	192.3	16	512	31.36; 33.02)	94.08 (99.07)	2,258.2 (2,377.7)	94.08 (99.07)	170	2x 6-Pin	$219
GeForce GTX 760 X2	November; 19 2013	2x GK104-225-A2	TSMC; 28HP	2x 3540	2x 294	PCIe 3x16	1006 (1072)		1502 (6008)	2x 1152:96:32:6	2x 2	GDDR5	2x 256	2x 192.3	2x 16	2x 512	64.38 (68.61)	225.34 (240.13)	4,635.6 (4,939.8)	225.34 (240.13)	250	2x 8-Pin	~$600
GeForce GTX 760 Ti OEM	September; 27, 2013	GK104-325-A2	TSMC; 28HP	3540	294	PCIe 3x16	915 (980)		1502 (6008)	1344:112:32:7	2	GDDR5	256	192.3	16	512	29.28 (31.36)	102.48 (109.76)	2,459.5 (2,634.2)	102.48 (109.76)	170	2x 6-Pin	OEM
GeForce GTX 760 Ti OEM (Rebrand)	September; 27, 2013	GK104-325-A2	TSMC; 28HP	3540	294	PCIe 3x16	915 (980)		1502 (6008)	1344:112:32:7	2	GDDR5	256	192.3	16	512	29.28 (31.36)	102.48 (109.76)	2,459.5 (2,634.2)	102.48 (109.76)	170	2x 6-Pin	OEM
GeForce GTX 770	May; 30, 2013	GK104-425-A2	TSMC; 28HP	3540	294	PCIe 3x16	1046 (1085)		1753 (7012)	1536:128:32:8	2	GDDR5	256	224.4	16	512	33.47 (34.72)	133.89 (138.88)	3,213.2 (3,333.1)	133.89 (138.88)	230	1x 6-Pin + 1x 8-Pin	$329
GeForce GTX 780	May; 23, 2013	GK110-300-A1	TSMC; 28HP	7080	561	PCIe 3x16	863 (902)		1502 (6008)	2304:192:48:12	3	GDDR5	384	288.4	16	1536	41.42 (43.30)	165.70 (173.18)	3,976.7 (4,156.4)	165.70 (173.18)	250	1x 6-Pin + 1x 8-Pin	$649
GeForce GTX 780 Rev. 2	September; 10, 2013	GK110-300-B1 (Note: The bios was completely reworked from the ground up.)	TSMC; 28HP	7080	561	PCIe 3x16	863 (902)		1502 (6008)	2304:192:48:12	3	GDDR5	384	288.4	16	1536	41.42 (43.30)	165.70 (173.18)	3,976.7 (4,156.4)	165.70 (173.18)	250	1x 6-Pin + 1x 8-Pin	$649
GeForce GTX 780 Rev. 2	September; 10, 2013	GK110-301-B1	TSMC; 28HP	7080	561	PCIe 3x16	863 (902)		1502 (6008)	2304:192:48:12	6	GDDR5	384	288.4	16	1536	41.42 (43.30)	165.70 (173.18)	3,976.7 (4,156.4)	165.70 (173.18)	250	1x 6-Pin + 1x 8-Pin	$549
GeForce GTX 780 Ti	November; 7, 2013	GK110-425-B1	TSMC; 28HP	7080	561	PCIe 3x16	875 (928)		1753 (7012)	2880:240:48:15	3	GDDR5	384	336.6	16	1536	42.0 (44.54)	210.0 (222.72)	5,040.0 (5,345.3)	210.0 (222.72)	250	1x 6-Pin + 1x 8-Pin	$699
GeForce GTX TITAN	February; 21, 2013	GK110-400-A1	TSMC; 28HP	7080	561	PCIe 3x16	836 (876)		1502 (6008)	2688:224:48:14	6	GDDR5	384	288.4	16	1536	40.13 (42.05)	187.26 (196.224)	4,494.3 (4,709.4)	1498.11 (1569.79)	250	1x 6-Pin + 1x 8-Pin	$999
GeForce GTX TITAN Black	February; 18, 2014	GK110-430-B1	TSMC; 28HP	7080	561	PCIe 3x16	889 (980)		1750 (7000)	2880:240:48:15	6	GDDR5	384	336	16	1536	42.67 (47.04)	213.36 (235.20)	5,120.6 (5,644.8)	1706.88 (1881.6)	250	1x 6-Pin + 1x 8-Pin	$999
GeForce GTX TITAN Z	May; 28, 2014	2× GK110-350-B1	TSMC; 28HP	2x 7080	2x 561	PCIe 3x16	705 (876)		1750 (7000)	2x 2880:240:48:15	2× 6	GDDR5	2× 384	2× 336	2x 16	2x 1536	67.68 (84.10)	338.40 (420.48)	8,121.6 (10,091.5)	2,707.20 (3,363.84)	375	2x 8-Pin	$2999
Model	Launch Date	Code Name	Fab (nm)	Transistors (million)	Die Size (mm^{2})	Bus Interface	Core (Boost) (MHz)	Shader (Boost) (MHz)	Memory (MHz) (MT/s)	Core Config	Size (GB)	DRAM Type	Bus Width (bit)	Bandwidth (GB/s)	L1 per SM(X)/(M) (KB)	L2 (KB)	Pixel (GP/s)	Texture (GT/s)	Single Precision	Double Precision	TDP (Watts)	Power Connectors	MSRP USD
Model	Launch Date	Code Name	Fab (nm)	Transistors (million)	Die Size (mm^{2})	Bus Interface	Clock Rate			Core Config	Memory Configuration				Cache		Fillrate		Processing Power (GFLOPS)		TDP (Watts)	Power Connectors	MSRP USD

== GeForce 900 series ==
- All models support Direct3D 12 (12_1), OpenGL 4.6, OpenCL 3.0, and Vulkan 1.4.
- All models are built on the TSMC 28HP process and interface with a PCIe 3x16 connector.

Model	Launch Date	Code Name	Transistors (billion)	Die Size (mm^{2})	Clock Rate		Core Config	Memory Configuration				Cache		Fillrate		Processing Power (GFLOPS)		TDP (Watts)	Power Connectors	MSRP (USD)
Model	Launch Date	Code Name	Transistors (billion)	Die Size (mm^{2})	Base (Boost) (MHz)	Memory (MHZ) (GT/s)	Core Config	Size (GB)	DRAM Type	Bus Width (bit)	Bandwidth (GB/s)	L1 per SMM (KB)	L2 (MB)	Pixel (GP/s)	Texture (GT/s)	Single Precision	Double Precision	TDP (Watts)	Power Connectors	MSRP (USD)
GeForce GTX 950 Low Power	March; 1, 2016	GM206-251-A1	2.94	228	1026 (1190)	1653 (6.6)	768:48:32:6	2	GDDR5	128	105.8	48	1	32.83 (38.08)	49.25 (57.12)	1,575.94 (1,827.84)	49.25 (57.12)	75	None	$159
GeForce GTX 950	August; 20, 2015	GM206-250-A1	2.94	228	1024 (1188)	1653 (6.6)	768:48:32:6	2	GDDR5	128	105.8	48	1	32.77 (38.02)	49.15 (57.02)	1,572.86 (1,824.77)	49.15 (57.02)	90	1x 6-Pin	$159
GeForce GTX 950 OEM	2016	GM206S	2.94	228	937 (1203)	1253 (5.0)	1024:64:32:8	2	GDDR5	128	80.19	48	1	29.98 (38.50)	59.97 (76.99)	1,918.98 (2,463.74)	59.97 (76.99)	?	None	OEM
GeForce GTX 960	January; 22, 2015	GM206-300-A1	2.94	228	1127 (1178)	1753 (7.0)	1024:64:32:8	2	GDDR5	128	112.2	48	1	36.06 (37.70)	72.13 (75.39)	2,308.10 (2,412.54)	72.13 (75.39)	120	1x 6-Pin	$199
GeForce GTX 960 OEM	November; 26, 2015	GM206	2.94	228	1176 (1201)	1753 (7.0)	1024:64:32:8	4	GDDR5	128	112.2	48	1	37.63 (38.43)	75.26 (76.86)	2,408.45 (2,459.65)	75.26 (76.86)	?	None	OEM
GeForce GTX 960 OEM	November; 26, 2015	GM204	5.2	398	924 (1038)	1253 (5.0)	1280:80:48:10	3	GDDR5	192	120.3	48	1.5	44.35 (49.82)	73.92 (83.04)	2,365.44 (2,657.28)	73.92 (83.04)	?	None	OEM
GeForce GTX 970	September; 19, 2014	GM204-200-A1	5.2	398	1050 (1178)	1753 (7.0)	1664:104:56:13	4	GDDR5	256	224.4	48	2	58.80 (65.97)	109.20 (122.51)	3,494.40 (3,920.38)	109.20 (122.51)	148	2x 6-Pin	$329
GeForce GTX 980	September; 18, 2014	GM204-400-A1	5.2	398	1127 (1216)	1753 (7.0)	2048:128:64:16	4	GDDR5	256	224.4	48	2	72.13 (77.82)	144.26 (155.65)	4,616.19 (4,980.74)	144.26 (155.65)	165	2x 6-Pin	$549
GeForce GTX 980 Ti	June; 2, 2015	GM200-310-A1	8	601	1000 (1076)	1753 (7.0)	2816:176:96:22	6	GDDR5	384	336.6	48	3	96.00 (103.30)	176.00 (189.38)	5,632.00 (6,060.03)	176.00 (189.38)	250	1x 6-Pin + 1x 8-Pin	$649
GeForce GTX TITAN X	March; 17, 2015	GM200-400-A1	8	601	1000 (1089)	1753 (7.0)	3072:192:96:24	12	GDDR5	384	336.6	48	3	96.00 (104.54)	192.00 (209.09)	6,144.00 (6,690.82)	192.00 (209.09)	250	1x 6-Pin + 1x 8-Pin	$999

== GeForce 10 series ==
- All models support Direct3D 12 (12_1), OpenGL 4.6, OpenCL 3.0, Vulkan 1.4, and CUDA 6.1.

Model	Launch Date	Code Name	Fab (nm)	Transistors (billion)	Die Size (mm^{2})	Bus Interface	Clock Rate		Core Config	Cache		Memory Configuration				Fillrate		Processing Power (GFLOPS)			TDP (Watts)	Power Connectors	Release Price (USD)	
Model	Launch Date	Code Name	Fab (nm)	Transistors (billion)	Die Size (mm^{2})	Bus Interface	Base (Boost) (MHz)	Memory (MHz) (GT/s)	Core Config	L1 Per SM(X) (KB)	L2 (MB)	Size (GB)	DRAM Type	Bus Width (bit)	Bandwidth (GB/s)	Pixel (GP/s)	Texture (GT/s)	Half Precision	Single Precision	Double Precision	TDP (Watts)	Power Connectors	MSRP	Founders Edition
GeForce GT 1010 OEM	January; 13, 2021	GP108-200-A1	Samsung; 14LPP	1.8	74	PCIe 3x4	1228 (1468)	1502 (6.0)	256:16:8:2	16	0.25	2	GDDR5	64	48.1	9.82 (11.74)	19.65 (23.49)	n/a	628.74 (751.62)	26.20 (31.32)	30	None	OEM	n/a
GeForce GT 1010 OEM	January; 13, 2021	GP108-200-A1	Samsung; 14LPP	1.8	74	PCIe 3x4	1152 (1380)	1050 (2.1)	256:16:8:2	16	0.25	2	DDR4	64	16.8	9.22 (11.04)	18.43 (22.08)	n/a	590.82 (706.56)	24.58 (29.44)	20	None	OEM	n/a
GeForce GT 1030	March; 12, 2018	GP108-310-A1	Samsung; 14LPP	1.8	74	PCIe 3x4	1152 (1379)	1050 (2.1)	384:24:16:3	48	0.5	2	DDR4	64	16.8	18.43 (22.06)	27.65 (33.10)	13.82 (16.55)	884.74 (1,059.07)	27.65 (33.10)	20	None	$79	n/a
GeForce GT 1030	May; 17, 2017	GP108-300-A1	Samsung; 14LPP	1.8	74	PCIe 3x4	1228 (1468)	1502 (6.0)	384:24:16:3	48	0.5	2	GDDR5	64	48.1	19.63 (23.49)	29.47 (35.23)	14.74 (17.62)	943.1 (1,127.42)	29.47 (35.23)	30	None	$69	n/a
GeForce GT 1030	September; 30, 2018	GK107	TSMC; 28HP	1.27	118	PCIe 3x16	1058	1250 (5.0)	384:32:16:2	16	0.25	2	GDDR5	128	80.0	16.93	33.86	n/a	812.54	33.86	65	1x 6-Pin	?	n/a
GeForce GTX 1050	October; 25, 2016	GP107-300-A1	Samsung; 14LPP	3.3	132	PCIe 3x16	1354 (1455)	1752 (7.0)	640:40:32:5	48	1	2	GDDR5	128	112.1	43.33 (46.56)	54.16 (58.20)	27.08 (29.10)	1,733.12 (1,862.40)	54.16 (58.20)	75	None	$109	n/a
GeForce GTX 1050	May; 21, 2018	GP107-301-K1-A1	Samsung; 14LPP	3.3	132	PCIe 3x16	1392 (1518)	1752 (7.0)	768:48:24:6	48	0.75	3	GDDR5	96	84.1	33.41 (36.43)	66.82 (72.86)	33.41 (36.43)	2,138.11 (2,331.65)	66.82 (72.86)	75	None	$109	n/a
GeForce GTX 1050 Ti	October; 25, 2016	GP107-400-A1	Samsung; 14LPP	3.3	132	PCIe 3x16	1291 (1392)	1752 (7.0)	768:48:32:6	48	1	4	GDDR5	128	112.1	41.31 (44.54)	61.97 (66.82)	30.98 (33.41)	1,982.98 (2,138.11)	61.97 (66.82)	75	None	$139	n/a
GeForce GTX 1060	December; 25, 2016	GP104-140-KA-A1	TSMC; 16FF	7.2	314	PCIe 3x16	1506 (1708)	2002 (8.0)	1152:72:48:9	48	1.5	3	GDDR5	192	192.2	72.29 (81.98)	108.43 (122.98)	54.22 (61.49)	3,469.82 (3,935.23)	108.43 (122.98)	120	1x 6-Pin	$199	n/a
GeForce GTX 1060	August; 18, 2016	GP106-300-A1	TSMC; 16FF	4.4	200	PCIe 3x16	1506 (1708)	2002 (8.0)	1152:72:48:9	48	1.5	3	GDDR5	192	192.2	72.29 (81.98)	108.43 (122.98)	54.22 (61.49)	3,469.82 (3,935.23)	108.43 (122.98)	120	1x 6-Pin	$199	n/a
GeForce GTX 1060 OEM	December; 26, 2017	GP106-350-K3-A1	TSMC; 16FF	4.4	200	PCIe 3x16	1506 (1709)	2002 (8.0)	1280:80:48:10	48	1.25	5	GDDR5	160	160.2	72.29 (82.03)	120.48 (136.72)	60.24 (68.36)	3,855.36 (4,375.04)	120.48 (136.72)	120	1x 6-Pin	OEM	n/a
GeForce GTX 1060 6 GB	March; 8, 2018	GP104-150-KA-A1	TSMC; 16FF	7.2	314	PCIe 3x16	1506 (1708)	2002 (8.0)	1280:80:48:10	48	1.5	6	GDDR5	192	192.2	72.29 (81.98)	120.48 (136.64)	60.24 (68.32)	3,855.36 (4,372.48)	120.48 (136.64)	120	1x 6-Pin	$299	n/a
GeForce GTX 1060 6 GB GDDR5X	October; 18, 2018	GP104-150-KA-A1	TSMC; 16FF	7.2	314	PCIe 3x16	1506 (1709)	1001 (8.0)	1280:80:48:10	48	1.5	6	GDDR5X	192	192.2	72.29 (82.03)	120.48 (136.72)	60.24 (68.36)	3,855.36 (4,375.04)	120.48 (136.72)	120	1x 6-Pin	$299	n/a
GeForce GTX 1060 Rev. 2	July; 19, 2016	GP106-400-A1	TSMC; 16FF	4.4	200	PCIe 3x16	1506 (1709)	2002 (8.0)	1280:80:48:10	48	1.5	6	GDDR5	192	192.2	72.29 (82.03)	120.48 (136.72)	60.24 (68.36)	3,855.36 (4,375.04)	120.48 (136.72)	120	1x 6-Pin	$249	$299
GeForce GTX 1060 Rev. 2	April; 20, 2017	GP106-410-A1	TSMC; 16FF	4.4	200	PCIe 3x16	1506 (1709)	2257 (9.0)	1280:80:48:10	48	1.5	6	GDDR5	192	216.7	72.29 (82.03)	120.48 (136.72)	60.24 (68.36)	3,855.36 (4,375.04)	120.48 (136.72)	120	1x 6-Pin	$299	n/a
GeForce GTX 1070	June; 10, 2016	GP104-200-A1	TSMC; 16FF	7.2	314	PCIe 3x16	1506 (1683)	2002 (8.0)	1920:120:64:15	48	2	8	GDDR5	256	256.3	96.38 (107.71)	180.72 (201.96)	90.3 (100.98)	5,783.04 (6,462.72)	180.72 (201.96)	150	1x 8-Pin	$379	$449
GeForce GTX 1070 GDDR5X	December; 4, 2018	GP104-200-A1	TSMC; 16FF	7.2	314	PCIe 3x16	1506 (1683)	1001 (8.0)	1920:120:64:15	48	2	8	GDDR5X	256	256.3	96.38 (107.71)	180.72 (201.96)	90.3 (100.98)	5,783.04 (6,462.72)	180.72 (201.96)	150	1x 8-Pin	$379	$449
GeForce GTX 1070 Ti	November; 2, 2017	GP104-300-A1	TSMC; 16FF	7.2	314	PCIe 3x16	1607 (1683)	2002 (8.0)	2432:152:64:19	48	2	8	GDDR5	256	256.3	102.85 (107.71)	244.26 (255.82)	122.13 (127.91)	7,816.45 (8,186.11)	244.26 (255.82)	180	1x 8-Pin	$399	$449
GeForce GTX 1080	May; 27, 2016	GP104-400-A1	TSMC; 16FF	7.2	314	PCIe 3x16	1607 (1733)	1251 (10)	2560:160:64:20	48	2	8	GDDR5X	256	320.3	102.85 (110.91)	257.12 (277.28)	128.56 (138.64)	8,227.84 (8,872.96)	257.12 (277.28)	180	1x 8-Pin	$599	$699
GeForce GTX 1080	April; 20, 2017	GP104-410-A1	TSMC; 16FF	7.2	314	PCIe 3x16	1607 (1733)	1376 (11.0)	2560:160:64:20	48	2	8	GDDR5X	256	352.3	102.85 (110.91)	257.12 (277.28)	128.56 (138.64)	8,227.84 (8,872.96)	257.12 (277.28)	180	1x 8-Pin	$499	$699
GeForce GTX 1080 Ti	March; 5, 2017	GP102-350-K1-A1	TSMC; 16FF	11.8	471	PCIe 3x16	1481 (1582)	1376 (11.0)	3584:224:88:28	48	2.75	11	GDDR5X	352	484.4	130.33 (139.22)	331.74 (354.37)	165.87 (177.18)	10,615.81 (11,339.78)	331.74 (354.37)	250	1x 6-Pin + 1x 8-Pin	$699	$699
TITAN X Pascal	August; 2, 2016	GP102-400-A1	TSMC; 16FF	11.8	471	PCIe 3x16	1417 (1531)	1251 (10.0)	3584:224:96:28	48	3	12	GDDR5X	384	480.4	136.03 (146.98)	317.41 (342.94)	158.70 (171.47)	10,157.06 (10,974.21)	317.41 (342.94)	250	1x 6-Pin + 1x 8-Pin	n/a	$1199
TITAN Xp	April; 6, 2017	GP102-450-A1	TSMC; 16FF	11.8	471	PCIe 3x16	1405 (1582)	1426 (11.4)	3840:240:96:30	48	3	12	GDDR5X	384	547.6	134.88 (151.87)	337.20 (379.68)	168.60 (189.84)	10,790.40 (12,149.76)	337.20 (379.68)	250	1x 6-Pin + 1x 8-Pin	n/a	$1199
Model	Launch Date	Code Name	Fab (nm)	Transistors (billion)	Die Size (mm^{2})	Bus Interface	Base (Boost) (MHz)	Memory (MHz) (GT/s)	Core Config	L1 Per SM(X) (KB)	L2 (MB)	Size (GB)	DRAM Type	Bus Width (bit)	Bandwidth (GB/s)	Pixel (GP/s)	Texture (GT/s)	Half Precision	Single Precision	Double Precision	TDP (Watts)	Power Connectors	MSRP	Founders Edition
Model	Launch Date	Code Name	Fab (nm)	Transistors (billion)	Die Size (mm^{2})	Bus Interface	Clock Rate		Core Config	Cache		Memory Configuration				Fillrate		Processing Power (GFLOPS)			TDP (Watts)	Power Connectors	Release Price (USD)	

== Volta series ==
- All models support Direct3D 12 (12_1), OpenGL 4.6, OpenCL 3.0, Vulkan 1.4, and CUDA 7.0.
- NVENC 6th gen.
- Tensor core 1st gen.
- All models are built on the TSMC 12FFN process with 21.1 billion transistors and a die size of 815 mm^{2}.

Model	Launch Date	Code Name	Bus Interface	Clock Rate		Core Config	Cache		Memory Configuration				Fillrate		Processing Power (TFLOPS)				TDP (Watts)	Power Connectors	MSRP (USD)
Model	Launch Date	Code Name	Bus Interface	Base (Boost) (MHz)	Memory (MHz) (GT/s)	Core Config	L1 per SM (KB)	L2 (MB)	Size (GB)	DRAM Type	Bus Width (bit)	Bandwidth (GB/s)	Pixel (GP/s)	Texture (GT/s)	Half Precision	Single Precision	Double Precision	Tensor (AI) Half Precision	TDP (Watts)	Power Connectors	MSRP (USD)
Nvidia Titan V	December; 7, 2017	GV100-400-A1	PCIe 3x16	1200 (1455)	848 (1.7)	5120:320: 96:80:640	96	4.5	12	HBM2	3072	651.3	115.20 (139.68)	384.00 (465.60)	24.58 (29.80)	12.29 (14.90)	6.14 (7.45)	98.30 (119.19)	250	1x 6-Pin + 1x 8-Pin	$2999
Nvidia Titan V (CEO Edition)	June; 21, 2018	GV100-???-A1	PCIe 3x16	1200 (1455)	848 (1.7)	5120:320: 128:80:640	128	6	32	HBM2	4096	868.4	153.60 (186.24)	384.00 (465.60)	24.58 (29.80)	12.29 (14.90)	6.14 (7.45)	98.30 (119.19)	250	1x 6-Pin + 1x 8-Pin	$5999

== GeForce GTX 16 series ==
- All models support Direct3D 12 (12_1), OpenGL 4.6, OpenCL 3.0, Vulkan 1.4, and CUDA 7.5.
- NVENC 5th gen.
- All models are built on the TSMC 12FFN process and interface with a PCIe 3x16 connector.

Model	Launch Date	Code Name	Transistors (billion)	Die Size (mm^{2})	Clock Rate		Core Config	Cache		Memory Configuration				Fillrate		Processing Power			TDP (Watts)	Power Connectors	MSRP (USD)
Model	Launch Date	Code Name	Transistors (billion)	Die Size (mm^{2})	Base (Boost) (MHz)	Memory (MHz) (GT/s)	Core Config	L1 per SM (KB)	L2 (MB)	Size (GB)	DRAM Type	Bus Width (bit)	Bandwidth (GB/s)	Pixel (GP/s)	Texture (GT/s)	Half Precision (TFLOPS)	Single Precision (TFLOPS)	Double Precision (GFLOPS)	TDP (Watts)	Power Connectors	MSRP (USD)
GeForce GTX 1630	June; 28, 2022	TU117-150-KA-A1	4.7	200	1740 (1785)	1500 (12.0)	512:32:16:8	64	1	4	GDDR6	64	96.0	27.84 (28.56)	55.68 (57.12)	3.564 (3.656)	1.782 (1.828)	55.68 (57.12)	75	None	$149
GeForce GTX 1650	April; 23, 2019	TU117-300-A1	4.7	200	1485 (1665)	2001 (8.0)	896:56:32:14	64	1	4	GDDR5	128	128.1	47.52 (53.28)	83.16 (93.24)	5.322 (5.967)	2.661 (2.984)	83.16 (93.24)	75	None	$149
GeForce GTX 1650	April; 1, 2020	TU117-300-A1	4.7	200	1410 (1590)	1500 (12.0)	896:56:32:14	64	1	4	GDDR6	128	192.0	45.12 (50.88)	78.96 (89.04)	5.053 (5.699)	2.527 (2.849)	78.96 (89.04)	75	None	$149
GeForce GTX 1650	July; 7, 2020	TU116-150-KA-A1	6.6	284	1410 (1590)	1500 (12.0)	896:56:32:14	64	1	4	GDDR6	128	192.0	45.12 (50.88)	78.96 (89.04)	5.053 (5.699)	2.527 (2.849)	78.96 (89.04)	80	None	$149
GeForce GTX 1650	June; 18, 2020	TU106-125-KAB-A1	10.8	445	1410 (1590)	1500 (12.0)	896:56:32:14	64	1	4	GDDR6	128	192.0	45.12 (50.88)	78.96 (89.04)	5.053 (5.699)	2.527 (2.849)	78.96 (89.04)	90	1x 6-Pin	$149
GeForce GTX 1650 Super	November; 22, 2019	TU116-250-KA-A1	6.6	284	1530 (1725)	1500 (12.0)	1280:80:32:20	64	1	4	GDDR6	128	192.0	48.96 (55.20)	122.40 (138.00)	7.834 (8.832)	3.917 (4.416)	122.40 (138.00)	100	1x 6-Pin	$159
GeForce GTX 1660	March; 14, 2019	TU116-300-A1	6.6	284	1530 (1785)	2001 (8.0)	1408:88:48:22	64	1.5	6	GDDR5	192	192.1	73.44 (85.68)	134.64 (157.08)	8.617 (10.053)	4.308 (5.027)	134.64 (157.08)	120	1x 8-Pin	$219
GeForce GTX 1660 Super	October; 29, 2019	TU116-300-A1	6.6	284	1530 (1785)	1750 (14.0)	1408:88:48:22	64	1.5	6	GDDR6	192	336.0	73.44 (85.68)	134.64 (157.08)	8.617 (10.053)	4.308 (5.027)	134.64 (157.08)	125	1x 8-Pin	$229
GeForce GTX 1660 Ti	February; 21, 2019	TU116-400-A1	6.6	284	1500 (1770)	1500 (12.0)	1536:96:48:24	64	1.5	6	GDDR6	192	288.0	72.00 (84.96)	144.00 (169.92)	9.216 (10.875)	4.608 (5,437)	144.00 (169.92)	120	1x 8-Pin	$279

== GeForce RTX 20 series ==
- All models support Direct3D 12 Ultimate (12_2), OpenGL 4.6, OpenCL 3.0, Vulkan 1.3, and CUDA 7.5.
- NVENC 7th gen.
- Tensor core 2nd gen.
- RT Core 1st gen.
- NVIDIA DLSS 1.0.
- Founder's Edition variants come from the factory with a higher boost clock.
- All models are built on the TSMC 12FFN process and interface with a PCIe 3x16 connector.
- Ray Tracing performance has been omitted from the table as it is fundamentally not possible to calculate exact performance values for RT Cores.

Model	Launch Date	Code Name	Transistors (billion)	Die Size (mm^{2})	Clock Rate		Core Config	Cache		Memory Configuration				Fillrate		Processing Power (TFLOPS)				TDP (Watts)	Power Connectors	Release Price (USD)	
Model	Launch Date	Code Name	Transistors (billion)	Die Size (mm^{2})	Base Boost (MHz)	Memory (MHz) (GT/s)	Core Config	L1 per SM (KB)	L2 (MB)	Size (GB)	DRAM Type	Bus Width (bit)	Bandwidth (GB/s)	Pixel (GP/s)	Texture (GT/s)	Half Precsion	Single Precision	Double Precision	Tensor (AI) Half Precsion	TDP (Watts)	Power Connectors	MSRP	Founders Edition
GeForce RTX 2060	January; 7, 2019	TU106-200A-KA-A1	10.8	445	1365 (1680)	1750 (14.0)	1920:120:48: 30:240:30	64	3	6	GDDR6	192	336.0	65.52 (80.64)	163.80 (201.60)	10.48 (12.90)	5.242 (6.451)	0.164 (0.202)	41.93 (51.61)	160	1x 8-Pin	$349	—N/a
GeForce RTX 2060	January; 10, 2020	TU104-150-KC-A1	13.6	545	1365 (1680)	1750 (14.0)	1920:120:48: 30:240:30	64	3	6	GDDR6	192	336.0	65.52 (80.64)	163.80 (201.60)	10.48 (12.90)	5.242 (6.451)	0.164 (0.202)	41.93 (51.61)	160	1x 8-Pin	$299	—N/a
GeForce RTX 2060	December; 7, 2021	TU106-300-KA-A1	10.8	445	1470 (1650)	1750 (14.0)	2176:136:64: 34:272:34	64	3	12	GDDR6	192	336.0	94.08 (105.60)	199.92 (224.40)	12.795 (14.362)	6.397 (7.181)	0.200 (0.224)	51.18 (57.45)	184	1x 8-Pin	$299	—N/a
GeForce RTX 2060 SUPER	July; 9, 2019	TU106-410-A1	10.8	445	1470 (1650)	1750 (14.0)	2176:136:64: 34:272:34	64	4	8	GDDR6	256	448.0	94.08 (105.60)	199.92 (224.40)	12.795 (14.362)	6.397 (7.181)	0.200 (0.224)	51.18 (57.45)	175	1x 8-Pin	$399	
GeForce RTX 2070	October; 17, 2018	TU106-400A-A1	10.8	445	1410 (1620)	1750 (14.0)	2304:144:64: 36:288:36	64	4	8	GDDR6	256	448.0	90.24 (103.68)	203.04 (233.28)	12.995 (14.930)	6.497 (7.465)	0.203 (0.233)	51.98 (59.72)	175	1x 8-Pin	$499	$599
GeForce RTX 2070 SUPER	July; 9, 2019	TU104-410-A1	13.6	545	1605 (1770)	1750 (14.0)	2560:160:64: 40:320:40	64	4	8	GDDR6	256	448.0	102.72 (113.28)	256.80 (283.20)	16.44 (18.12)	8.218 (9.062)	0.257 (0.283)	65.74 (72.50)	215	1x 6-Pin + 1x 8-Pin	$499	$499
GeForce RTX 2080	September; 20, 2018	TU104-400A-A1	13.6	545	1515 (1710)	1750 (14.0)	2944:184:64: 46:368:46	64	4	8	GDDR6	256	448.0	96.96 (109.44)	278.76 (314.64)	17.84 (20.137)	8.920 (10.068)	0.279 (0.315)	71.36 (80.55)	215	1x 6-Pin + 1x 8-Pin	$699	$799
GeForce RTX 2080 SUPER	July; 23, 2019	TU104-450-A1	13.6	545	1650 (1815)	1973 (15.5)	3072:192:64: 48:384:48	64	4	8	GDDR6	256	495.9	105.60 (116.16)	316.80 (348.48)	20.275 (22.303)	10.138 (11.151)	0.317 (0.348)	81.10 (89.21)	250	1x 6-Pin + 1x 8-Pin	$699	$699
GeForce RTX 2080 Ti	September; 20, 2018	TU102-300A-K1-A1	18.6	754	1350 (1545)	1750 (14.0)	4352:272:88: 68:544:68	64	5.5	11	GDDR6	352	616.0	118.80 (135.96)	367.20 (420.24)	23.501 (26.895)	11.750 (13.448)	0.367 (0.420)	94.00 (107.58)	250	2x 8-Pin	$999	$1,199
Titan RTX	December; 18, 2018	TU102-400-A1	18.6	754	1350 (1770)	1750 (14.0)	4608:288:96: 72:576:72	64	6	24	GDDR6	384	672.0	129.60 ( 169.92)	388.80 (509.76)	24.883 (32.625)	12.442 (16.312)	0.389 (0.510)	99.53 (130.50)	280	2x 8-Pin	n/a	$2,499

== GeForce RTX 30 series ==
- All models support Direct3D 12 Ultimate (12_2), OpenGL 4.6, OpenCL 3.0, Vulkan 1.3 and CUDA 8.6.
- NVENC 7th gen.
- Tensor core 3rd gen.
- RT Core 2nd gen.
- NVIDIA DLSS 2.0.
- All models are built on the Samsung 8LPP process.
- Only the RTX 3090 and RTX 3090 Ti support NVLink.

Model	Launch Date	Code Name	Transistors (billion)	Die size (mm^{2})	Bus Interface	Clock Rate		Core Config	Cache		Memory Configuration				Fillrate		Processing Power (TFLOPS)						TDP (Watts)	Release Price (USD)	
Model	Launch Date	Code Name	Transistors (billion)	Die size (mm^{2})	Bus Interface	Base Boost (MHz)	Memory (MHz) (GT/s)	Core Config	L1 per SM (KB)	L2 (MB)	Size (GB)	Bus Type	Bus Width (bit)	Bandwidth (GB/s)	Pixel (GP/s)	Texture (GT/s)	Half Precision (FP16 1:1)	Single Precision (FP32)	Double Precision (FP64 1:64)	Tensor (AI) BF16 Dense 1:1 (1x)	Tensor (AI) FP16 Sparse 2:4 (2x)	Ray Tracing (Note: Ray tracing performance is a rough estimate provided by NVIDIA, as it is not fundamentally possible to calculate exact performance values for RT cores working together. Base clock values were calculated off of said values, which uses boost clocks.)	TDP (Watts)	MSRP	Founders Edition
GeForce RTX 3050 6 GB	February; 2, 2024	GA107-325-K2-A1	8.7	200.0	PCIe; 4 x8	1042 (1470)	1750 (14.0)	2304:72:32: 18:72:18	128	2	6	GDDR6	96	168.0	33.34 (47.04)	75.02 (105.84)	4.802 (6.774)		0.075 (0.106)	19.21 (27.10)	38.41 (54.19)	~11.5 (~16.2) (Note: The RTX 3050 6 GB, RTX 3050 OEM, and RTX 3060 OEM do not have advertised ray tracing performance values, they have been very roughly estimated by dividing and multiplying core and clocks from non-OEM variants.)	70	$179	—N/a
GeForce RTX 3050	December; 16, 2022	GA107-350-A1	8.7	200.0	PCIe; 4 x8	1552 (1777)	1750 (14.0)	2560:80:32: 20:80:20	128	2	8	GDDR6	128	224.0	49.66 (56.86)	124.16 (142.16)	7.946 (9.098)		0.124 (0.142)	31.78 (36.39)	63.57 (72.79)	15.9~ (~18.2)	115	$249	—N/a
GeForce RTX 3050	January; 4, 2022	GA106-150-KA-A1	12.0	276.0	PCIe; 4 x8	1552 (1777)	1750 (14.0)	2560:80:32: 20:80:20	128	2	8	GDDR6	128	224.0	49.66 (56.86)	124.16 (142.16)	7.946 (9.098)		0.124 (0.142)	31.78 (36.39)	63.57 (72.79)	15.9~ (~18.2)	130	$249	—N/a
GeForce RTX 3050 OEM	January; 27, 2022	GA106-150-KA-A1	12.0	276.0	PCIe; 4 x8	1515 (1755)	1750 (14.0)	2304:72:32: 18:72:18	128	2	8	GDDR6	128	224.0	48.48 (56.16)	109.08 (126.36)	6.981 (8.087)		0.109 (0.126)	27.92 (32.35)	55.85 (64.70)	~11.5 (~16.2)	130	OEM	—N/a
GeForce RTX 3060	October; 12, 2022	GA106-302-A1	12.0	276.0	PCIe; 4 x16	1320 (1777)	1875 (15.0)	3584:112:48: 28:112:28	128	3	8	GDDR6	128	224.0	63.36 (85.30)	147.84 (199.02)	9.462 (12.738)		0.148 (0.199)	37.85 (50.95)	75.69 (101.90)	~18.6 (~25.0)	170	$329	—N/a
GeForce RTX 3060	October; 2022	GA104	17.4	392.5	PCIe; 4 x16	1320 (1777)	1875 (15.0)	3584:112:64: 28:112:28	128	3	8	GDDR6	128	224.0	84.48 (113.72)	147.84 (199.02)	9.462 (12.738)		0.148 (0.199)	37.85 (50.95)	75.69 (101.90)	~18.6 (~25.0)	195	$329	—N/a
GeForce RTX 3060 12 GB	February; 25, 2021	GA106-300-A1	12.0	276.0	PCIe; 4 x16	1320 (1777)	1875 (15.0)	3584:112:48: 28:112:28	128	3	12	GDDR6	192	336.0	63.36 (85.30)	147.84 (199.02)	9.462 (12.738)		0.148 (0.199)	37.85 (50.95)	75.69 (101.90)	~18.6 (~25.0)	170	$329	—N/a
GeForce RTX 3060 12 GB	September; 1, 2021	GA104-150-KC-A1	17.4	392.5	PCIe; 4 x16	1320 (1777)	1875 (15.0)	3584:112:64: 28:112:28	128	3	12	GDDR6	192	336.0	84.48 (113.72)	147.84 (199.02)	9.462 (12.738)		0.148 (0.199)	37.85 (50.95)	75.69 (101.90)	~18.6 (~25.0)	170	$329	—N/a
GeForce RTX 3060 OEM	February; 25, 2021	GA106-400-A1	17.4	392.5	PCIe; 4 x16	1627 (1852)	1750 (14.0)	3840:120:48: 30:120:30	128	3	6	GDDR6	192	336.0	78.10 (88.90)	195.24 (222.24)	12.395 (14.223)		0.195 (0.222)	49.98 (56.89)	99.96 (113.79)	~24.5 (~27.9)	185	OEM	—N/a
GeForce RTX 3060 Ti	December; 2, 2020	GA104-200-A1	17.4	392.5	PCIe; 4 x16	1410 (1665)	1750 (14.0)	4864:152:80: 38:152:38	128	4	8	GDDR6	256	448.0	112.80 (133.20)	214.32 (253.08)	13.716 (16.197)		0.214 (0.253)	54.87 (64.79)	109.72 (129.58)	~27.4 (~32.4)	200	$399	
GeForce RTX 3060 Ti	February; 23, 2022	GA103-200-A1	22.0	496.0	PCIe; 4 x16	1410 (1665)	1750 (14.0)	4864:152:80: 38:152:38	128	4	8	GDDR6	256	448.0	112.80 (133.20)	214.32 (253.08)	13.716 (16.197)		0.214 (0.253)	54.87 (64.79)	109.72 (129.58)	~27.4 (~32.4)	200	$399	
GeForce RTX 3060 Ti GDDR6X	October; 19, 2022	GA104-202-A1	17.4	392.5	PCIe; 4 x16	1410 (1665)	1188 (19.0)	4864:152:80: 38:152:38	128	4	8	GDDR6X	256	608.3	112.80 (133.20)	214.32 (253.08)	13.716 (16.197)		0.214 (0.253)	54.87 (64.79)	109.72 (129.58)	~27.4 (~32.4)	225	$399	
GeForce RTX 3070	October; 29, 2020	GA104-300-A1	17.4	392.5	PCIe; 4 x16	1500 (1725)	1750 (14.0)	5888:184:96: 46:184:46	128	4	8	GDDR6	256	448.0	144.00 (165.60)	276.00 (317.40)	17.664 (20.314)		0.276 (0.317)	70.66 (81.25)	141.31 (162.51)	~35.3 (~40.6)	220	$499	
GeForce RTX 3070 Ti	June; 10, 2021	GA104-400-A1	17.4	392.5	PCIe; 4 x16	1575 (1770)	1188 (19.0)	6144:192:96: 48:192:48	128	4	8	GDDR6X	256	608.3	151.20 (165.60)	302.40 (331.20)	19.354 (21.750)		0.302 (0.331)	77.41 (87.00)	154.83 (174.00)	~36.0 (~43.5)	290	$599	
GeForce RTX 3070 Ti	October; 21, 2022	GA102-150-A1	28.3	628.4	PCIe; 4 x16	1575 (1770)	1188 (19.0)	6144:192:96: 48:192:48	128	4	8	GDDR6X	256	608.3	151.20 (165.60)	302.40 (331.20)	19.354 (21.750)		0.302 (0.331)	77.41 (87.00)	154.83 (174.00)	~36.0 (~43.5)	290	$599	
GeForce RTX 3080	September; 17, 2020	GA102-200-KD-A1	28.3	628.4	PCIe; 4 x16	1440 (1710)	1188 (19.0)	8704:272:96: 68:272:68	128	5	10	GDDR6X	320	760.3	138.24 (164.16)	391.68 (465.12)	25.068 (29.768)		0.392 (0.465)	100.27 (119.07)	200.54 (238.14)	~50.1 (~59.5)	320	$699	
GeForce RTX 3080 12 GB	January; 11, 2022	GA102-220-A1	28.3	628.4	PCIe; 4 x16	1260 (1710)	1188 (19.0)	8960:280:96: 70:280:70	128	6	12	GDDR6X	384	912.4	120.96 (164.16)	352.80 (478.80)	22.579 (30.64)		0.353 (0.479)	90.32 (122.57)	180.63 (245.15)	~45.2 (~61.3)	350	$799	
GeForce RTX 3080 Ti	June; 3, 2021	GA102-225-A1	28.3	628.4	PCIe; 4 x16	1365 (1665)	1188 (19.0)	10240:320:112: 80:320:80	128	6	12	GDDR6X	384	912.4	152.88 (186.48)	436.80 (532.80)	27.955 (34.099)		0.437 (0.533)	111.82 (136.40)	223.64 (272.80)	~55.9 (~68.2)	350	$1199	
GeForce RTX 3080 Ti 20 GB	January; 2022	GA102-250-KD-A1	28.3	628.4	PCIe; 4 x16	1335 (1665)	1188 (19.0)	10240:320:112: 80:320:80	128	6	20	GDDR6X	320	760.3	149.52 (186.48)	427.20 (532.80)	27.341 (34.099)		0.427 (0.533)	109.36 (136.40)	218.73 (272.80)	~54.7 (~68.2)	350	$1199	
GeForce RTX 3090	September; 24, 2020	GA102-300-A1	28.3	628.4	PCIe; 4 x16	1395 (1695)	1219 (19.5)	10496:328:112: 82:328:82	128	6	24	GDDR6X	384	936.2	156.24 (189.84)	457.56 (555.96)	29.284 (35.581)		0.458 (0.556)	117.14 (142.33)	234.27 (284.65)	~58.5 (~71.1)	350	$1499	
GeForce RTX 3090 Ti	March; 29, 2022	GA102-350-A1	28.3	628.4	PCIe; 4 x16	1560 (1860)	1313 (21.0)	10752:336:112: 84:336:84	128	6	24	GDDR6X	384	1008.3	174.72 (208.32)	524.16 (624.96)	33.546 (39.997)		0.524 (0.625)	134.18 (159.99)	268.37 (319.98)	~67.0 (~79.9)	450	$1999	

== GeForce RTX 40 series ==
- All models support Direct3D 12 Ultimate (12_2), OpenGL 4.6, OpenCL 3.0, Vulkan 1.3 and CUDA 8.9.
- Tensor core 4th gen.
- RT core 3rd gen.
- NVIDIA DLSS 3 & 3.5.
- NVENC 8th gen.
- NVLink is no longer supported.
- SER 1.0. (Shader Execution Reordering)
- All models are built on the TSMC 4N process.

Model	Launch Date	Code Name	Transistors (billion)	Die Size (mm^{2})	Bus Interface	Clock Rate		Core Config	Cache		Memory Configuration				Fillrate		Processing Power (TFLOPS)								TDP (Watts)	Release Price (USD)	
Model	Launch Date	Code Name	Transistors (billion)	Die Size (mm^{2})	Bus Interface	Base Boost (MHz)	Memory (MHz) (GT/s)	Core Config	L1 per SM (KB)	L2 (MB)	Size (GB)	Bus Type	Bus Width (bit)	Bandwidth (GB/s)	Pixel (GP/s)	Texture (GT/s)	Half Precision (FP16 1:1)	Single Precision (FP32)	Double Precision (FP64 1:64)	Tensor (AI) FP16 Dense 1:1 (1x)	Tensor (AI) FP8 Dense 1:1 (2x)	Tensor (AI) FP16 Sparse 2:4 (2x)	Tensor (AI) FP8 Sparse 2:4 (4x)	Ray Tracing (Note: Ray tracing performance is a rough estimate provided by NVIDIA, as it is not fundamentally possible to calculate exact performance values for RT cores working together. Base clock values were calculated off of said values, which uses boost clocks.)	TDP (Watts)	MSRP	Founders Edition
GeForce RTX 4060	June; 29, 2023	AD107-400-A1	18.9	158.7	PCIe; 4 x8	1830 (2460)	2125 (17.0)	3072:96:48: 24:96:24	128	24	8	GDDR6	128	272.0	87.84 (118.08)	175.68 (236.16)	11.244 (15.114)		0.176 (0.236)	44.974 (60.457)	89.948 (120.914)		179.896 (241.828)	~26.0 (~35.0)	115	$299	—N/a
GeForce RTX 4060	April; 2024	AD106-155-A1	22.9	187.8	PCIe; 4 x8	1830 (2460)	2125 (17.0)	3072:96:48: 24:96:24	128	24	8	GDDR6	128	272.0	87.84 (118.08)	175.68 (236.16)	11.244 (15.114)		0.176 (0.236)	44.974 (60.457)	89.948 (120.914)		179.896 (241.828)	~26.0 (~35.0)	115	$299	—N/a
GeForce RTX 4060 Ti	May; 24, 2023	AD106-350-A1	22.9	187.8	PCIe; 4 x8	2310 (2535)	2250 (18.0)	4352:136:48: 34:136:34	128	32	8	GDDR6	128	288.0	110.88 (121.68)	314.16 (344.76)	20.106 (22.065)		0.314 (0.345)	80.425 (88.259)	160.85 (176.517)		321.700 (353.034)	~46.5 (~51.0)	160	$399	
GeForce RTX 4060 Ti	April; 2024	AD104-150-K1-A1	35.8	294.5	PCIe; 4 x8	2310 (2535)	2250 (18.0)	4352:136:48: 34:136:34	128	32	8	GDDR6	128	288.0	110.88 (121.68)	314.16 (344.76)	20.106 (22.065)		0.314 (0.345)	80.425 (88.259)	160.85 (176.517)		321.700 (353.034)	~46.5 (~51.0)	160	$399	
GeForce RTX 4060 Ti 16 GB	July; 18, 2023	AD106-351-A1	22.9	187.8	PCIe; 4 x8	2310 (2535)	2250 (18.0)	4352:136:48: 34:136:34	128	32	16	GDDR6	128	288.0	110.88 (121.68)	314.16 (344.76)	20.106 (22.065)		0.314 (0.345)	80.425 (88.259)	160.85 (176.517)		321.700 (353.034)	~46.5 (~51.0)	160	$499	—N/a
GeForce RTX 4070 GDDR6	August; 20, 2024	AD104-2??-A1	35.8	294.5	PCIe; 4 x16	1920 (2475)	2500 (20.0)	5888:184:64: 46:184:46	128	36	12	GDDR6	192	480.0	122.88 (158.40)	353.28 (455.40)	22.610 (29.146)		0.353 (0.455)	90.440 (116.582)	180.880 (233.165)		361.759 (466.330)	~51.0 (~67.0)	200	$599	
GeForce RTX 4070	April; 13, 2023	AD104-250-A1	35.8	294.5	PCIe; 4 x16	1920 (2475)	1313 (21.0)	5888:184:64: 46:184:46	128	36	12	GDDR6X	192	504.2	122.88 (158.40)	353.28 (455.40)	22.610 (29.146)		0.353 (0.455)	90.440 (116.582)	180.880 (233.165)		361.759 (466.330)	~51.0 (~67.0)	200	$599	
GeForce RTX 4070	March; 2024	AD103-175-K1-A1	45.9	378.6	PCIe; 4 x16	1920 (2475)	1313 (21.0)	5888:184:64: 46:184:46	128	36	12	GDDR6X	192	504.2	122.88 (158.40)	353.28 (455.40)	22.610 (29.146)		0.353 (0.455)	90.440 (116.582)	180.880 (233.165)		361.759 (466.330)	~51.0 (~67.0)	200	$599	
GeForce RTX 4070 Super	January; 17, 2024	AD104-350-A1	35.8	294.5	PCIe; 4 x16	1980 (2475)	1313 (21.0)	7168:224:80: 56:224:56	128	48	12	GDDR6X	192	504.2	154.80 (443.52)	443.52 (554.40)	28.385 (35.482)		0.444 (0.554)	113.541 (141.926)	227.082 (283.853)		454.164 (567.706)	~65.6 (~82.0)	220	$599	
GeForce RTX 4070 Ti	January; 5, 2023	AD104-400-A1	35.8	294.5	PCIe; 4 x16	2310 (2610)	1313 (21.0)	7680:240:80: 60:240:60	128	48	12	GDDR6X	192	504.2	184.80 (208.80)	554.40 (626.40)	35.482 (40.090)		0.554 (0.626)	141.926 (160.358)	283.853 (320.717)		567.706 (610.434)	~82.0 (~92.7)	285	$799	—N/a
GeForce RTX 4070 Ti Super	January; 24, 2024	AD103-275-A1	45.9	378.6	PCIe; 4 x16	2340 (2610)	1313 (21.0)	8448:264:96: 66:264:66	128	48	16	GDDR6X	256	672.3	224.64 (250.56)	617.76 (689.04)	39.537 (44.099)		0.618 (0.689)	158.147 (176.394)	316.293 (352.788)		632.586 (705.577)	~91.4 (~102.0)	285	$799	—N/a
GeForce RTX 4070 Ti Super	June; 10, 2024	AD102-175-KEF-A1	76.3	608.5	PCIe; 4 x16	2340 (2610)	1313 (21.0)	8448:264:96: 66:264:66	128	48	16	GDDR6X	256	672.3	224.64 (250.56)	617.76 (689.04)	39.537 (44.099)		0.618 (0.689)	158.147 (176.394)	316.293 (352.788)		632.586 (705.577)	~91.4 (~102.0)	285	$799	—N/a
GeForce RTX 4080	November; 16, 2022	AD103-300-A1	45.9	378.6	PCIe; 4 x16	2205 (2505)	1400 (22.4)	9728:304:112: 76:304:76	128	64	16	GDDR6X	256	716.8	246.96 (280.56)	670.32 (761.52)	42.900 (48.737)		0.670 (0.762)	171.602 (194.949)	343.204 (389.898)		686.408 (779.797)	~99.2 (~112.7)	320	$1199	
GeForce RTX 4080 Super	January; 31, 2024	AD103-400-A1	45.9	378.6	PCIe; 4 x16	2295 (2550)	1438 (23.0)	10240:320:112: 80:320:80	128	64	16	GDDR6X	256	736.3	257.04 (285.60)	734.40 (816.00)	47.002 (52.224)		0.734 (0.816)	188.006 (208.896)	376.013 (417.792)		752.026 (835.584)	~108.9 (~121.0)	320	$999	
GeForce RTX 4090 D	December; 28, 2023	AD102-250-A1	76.3	608.5	PCIe; 4 x16	2280 (2520)	1313 (21.0)	14592:456:176: 114:456:114	128	72	24	GDDR6X	384	1008.0	401.28 (443.52)	1039.68 (1149.12)	66.540 (73.544)		1.040 (1.149)	266.158 (294.174)	532.316 (588.349)		1046.632 (1176.699)	~153.8 (~170.0)	425	CN¥12,999 (USD $1599)	—N/a
GeForce RTX 4090	October; 12, 2022	AD102-300-A1	76.3	608.5	PCIe; 4 x16	2235 (2520)	1313 (21.0)	16384:512:176: 128:512:128	128	72	24	GDDR6X	384	1008.0	393.36 (443.52)	1144.32 (1290.24)	73.236 (82.575)		1.144 (1.290)	292.946 (330.301)	585.892 (660.603)		1171.784 (1321.206)	~169.4 (~191.0)	450	$1599	

== GeForce RTX 50 series ==
- The GeForce RTX 50 series desktop GPUs are the first consumer GPUs to utilize GDDR7 VRAM.
- All models support Direct3D 12 Ultimate (12_2), OpenGL 4.6, OpenCL 3.0, Vulkan 1.4 and CUDA 12.0.
- NVENC 9th gen.
- NVIDIA DLSS 4.
- Tensor core 5th gen.
- RT core 4th gen.
- SER 2.0.
- LSS 1.0. (Linear Swept Spheres)
- All models are built on the TSMC 4N process.

Model	Launch Date	Code Name	Transistors (billion)	Die Size (mm^{2})	Bus Interface	Clock Rate		Core Config	Cache		Memory Configuration				Fillrate		Processing Power (TFLOPS)								TDP (Watts)	Release Price (USD)	
Model	Launch Date	Code Name	Transistors (billion)	Die Size (mm^{2})	Bus Interface	Base (Boost) (MHz)	Memory (MHz) (GT/s)	Core Config	L1 per SM (KB)	L2 (MB)	Size (GB)	Bus Type	Bus Width (bit)	Bandwidth (GB/s)	Pixel (GP/s)	Texture (GT/s)	Half Precision FP16 (1:1)	Single Precision FP32	Double Precision FP64 (1:64)	Tensor (AI)				Ray Tracing (Note: Ray tracing performance is a rough estimate provided by NVIDIA, as it is not fundamentally possible to calculate exact performance values for RT cores working together. Base clock values were calculated off of said values, which uses boost clocks.)	TDP (Watts)	MSRP	Founders Edition
Model	Launch Date	Code Name	Transistors (billion)	Die Size (mm^{2})	Bus Interface	Base (Boost) (MHz)	Memory (MHz) (GT/s)	Core Config	L1 per SM (KB)	L2 (MB)	Size (GB)	Bus Type	Bus Width (bit)	Bandwidth (GB/s)	Pixel (GP/s)	Texture (GT/s)	Half Precision FP16 (1:1)	Single Precision FP32	Double Precision FP64 (1:64)	Dense FP16 (1:1)	Sparse FP16 (2:4) Dense FP8 (1:1)	Sparse FP8 (2:4) Dense FP4 (1:1)	Sparse FP4 (2:4)	Ray Tracing	TDP (Watts)	MSRP	Founders Edition
GeForce RTX 5050	July; 1, 2025	GB207-300-A1	16.9	149.0	PCIe; 5 x8	2317 (2572)	2500 (20.0)	2560:80:32: 20:80:20	128	24	8	GDDR6	128	320.0	74.14 (82.30)	185.36 (205.76)	11.863 (13.169)		0.185 (0.206)	47.452 (52.675)	94.904 (105.349)	189.809 (210.698)	379.617 (421.396)	~36.0 (~40.0)	130	$249	—N/a
GeForce RTX 5060	May; 19, 2025	GB206-250-A1	21.9	181.0	PCIe; 5 x8	2280 (2497)	1750 (28.0)	3840:120:48: 30:120:30	128	32	8	GDDR7	128	448.0	109.44 (119.86)	273.60 (299.64)	17.510 (19.177)		0.274 (0.300)	70.042 (76.708)	140.083 (153.416)	280.166 (306.831)	560.333 (613.663)	~53.0 (~58.0)	145	$299	—N/a
GeForce RTX 5060 Ti	April; 16, 2025	GB206-300-A1	21.9	181.0	PCIe; 5 x8	2407 (2572)	1750 (28.0)	4608:144:48: 36:144:36	128	32	8	GDDR7	128	448.0	115.54 (123.46)	346.61 (370.37)	22.183 (23.704)		0.347 (0.370)	88.732 (94.814)	177.463 (189.628)	354.927 (379.257)	709.853 (758.514)	~67.4 (~72.0)	180	$379	—N/a
GeForce RTX 5060 Ti 16 GB	April; 16, 2025	GB206-300-A1	21.9	181.0	PCIe; 5 x8	2407 (2572)	1750 (28.0)	4608:144:48: 36:144:36	128	32	16	GDDR7	128	448.0	115.54 (123.46)	346.61 (370.37)	22.183 (23.704)		0.347 (0.370)	88.732 (94.814)	177.463 (189.628)	354.927 (379.257)	709.853 (758.514)	~67.4 (~72.0)	180	$429	—N/a
GeForce RTX 5070	March; 4, 2025	GB205-300-A1	31.1	263.0	PCIe; 5 x16	2325 (2512)	1750 (28.0)	6144:192:80: 48:192:48	128	48	12	GDDR7	192	672.0	186.00 (200.96)	446.40 (482.30)	28.430 (30.717)		0.446 (0.482)	114.278 (123.470)	228.557 (246.940)	457.114 (493.879)	914.227 (987.759)	~87.0 (~94.0)	250	$549	
GeForce RTX 5070 Ti	February; 20, 2025	GB203-300-A1	45.6	378.0	PCIe; 5 x16	2295 (2452)	1750 (28.0)	8960:280:96: 70:280:70	128	48	16	GDDR7	256	896.0	220.32 (235.39)	642.60 (686.56)	41.126 (43.940)		0.643 (0.687)	164.506 (175.759)	329.011 (351.519)	658.022 (703.037)	1,316.045 (1,406.075)	~124.5 (~133.0)	300	$749	—N/a
GeForce RTX 5080	January; 30, 2025	GB203-400-A1	45.6	378.0	PCIe; 5 x16	2295 (2617)	1875 (30.0)	10752:336:112: 84:336:84	128	64	16	GDDR7	256	960.0	257.04 (293.10)	771.12 (879.31)	49.352 (56.276)		0.771 (0.879)	197.407 (225.104)	394.813 (450.208)	789.627 (900.415)	1,579.254 (1,800.831)	~150.0 (~171.0)	360	$999	
GeForce RTX 5090 D	January; 30, 2025	GB202-250-A1	92.2	750.0	PCIe; 5 x16	2017 (2407)	1750 (28.0)	21760:680:176: 170:680:170	128	96	32	GDDR7	512	1,792.0	354.99 (423.63)	1,372.56; 1,636.76	87.780 (104.753)		1.373 (1.637)	351.119 (419.011)	702.239 (838.021)	1,404.477 (1,676.042)	2,375.000 (2,375.000) (Note: The 5090D & 5090D V2 GPUs are limited to a maximum of 2,375 AI TFLOPS, it is speculated this is achieved through a firmware or bios program. It has also been reported when crypto mining or AI workloads are detected, performance for these tasks can be throttled or locked. Gaming performance is not sacrificed.)	~266.1 (~317.5)	575	CN¥16,499 (USD $2,299)	
GeForce RTX 5090 D V2	August; 15, 2025	GB202-240-K1-A1	92.2	750.0	PCIe; 5 x16	2017 (2407)	1750 (28.0)	21760:680:176: 170:680:170	128	96	24	GDDR7	384	1,344.0	354.99 (423.63)	1,372.56; 1,636.76	87.780 (104.753)		1.373 (1.637)	351.119 (419.011)	702.239 (838.021)	1,404.477 (1,676.042)	2,375.000 (2,375.000)	~266.1 (~317.5)	575	CN¥16,499 (USD $2,299)	
GeForce RTX 5090	January; 30, 2025	GB202-300	92.2	750.0	PCIe; 5 x16	2017 (2407)	1750 (28.0)	21760:680:176: 170:680:170	128	96	32	GDDR7	512	1,792.0	354.99 (423.63)	1,372.56; 1,636.76	87.780 (104.753)		1.373 (1.637)	351.119 (419.011)	702.239 (838.021)	1,404.477 (1,676.042)	2,808.955 (3,352.084)	~266.1 (~317.5)	575	$1,999	

== See also ==
- nouveau (software)
- Scalable Link Interface (SLI)
- TurboCache
- Tegra
- Apple M1
- CUDA
- Nvidia NVDEC
- Nvidia NVENC
- Qualcomm Adreno
- ARM Mali
- Comparison of Nvidia nForce chipsets
- List of AMD graphics processing units
- List of Intel graphics processing units
- List of eponyms of Nvidia GPU microarchitectures
- Imageon by ATI (Now AMD)
