= Handheld game console =

Portable self-contained video game console

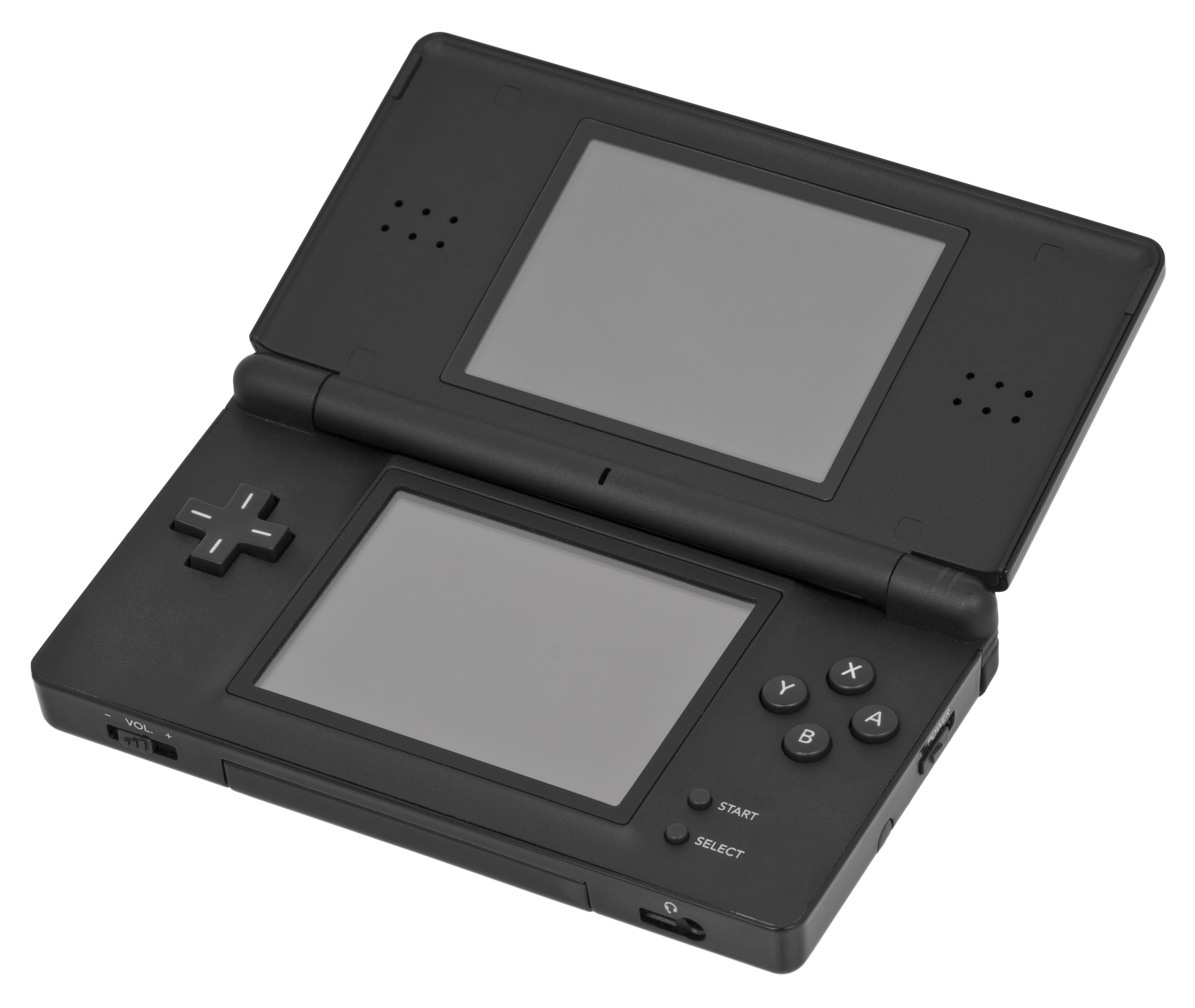
Nintendo DS Lite (2006), the best-selling handheld console and the third best-selling console overall

A handheld game console, or simply handheld console, is a small, portable self-contained video game console with a built-in screen, game controls and speakers. Handheld game consoles are smaller than home video game consoles and contain the console, screen, speakers, and controls in one unit, allowing players to carry them and play them at any time or place.

In 1976, Mattel introduced the first handheld electronic game with the release of Auto Race. Later, several companies—including Coleco and Milton Bradley—made their own single-game, lightweight table-top or handheld electronic game devices. The first commercially successful handheld console was Merlin from 1978, which sold more than 5 million units. The first handheld game console with interchangeable cartridges is the Milton Bradley Microvision in 1979.

Nintendo is credited with popularizing the handheld console concept with the release of the Game Boy in 1989 and continues to dominate the handheld console market. The first internet-enabled handheld console and the first with a touchscreen was the Game.com released by Tiger Electronics in 1997. The Nintendo DS, released in 2004, popularized touchscreen controls and Wireless online gaming, becoming the best-selling handheld console with over 150 million units sold worldwide. (Note: Despite Nintendo Switch has a higher sales since 2025, it's widely considered as a hybrid console rather than a traditional handheld.)

== History ==
=== Timeline ===
This table describes handheld game consoles that have over 1 million lifetime sales, classified by console generations. This list does not include dedicated consoles (such as LCD games and the Tamagotchi) except those before fourth generation, as no handheld consoles achieved this milestone before this generation.

| Manufacturer | Handheld Generations | | | | | | | |
| Manufacturer | Second (1979–1991) | Fourth (1989–2003) | Fifth (1995–2003) | Sixth (1999–2010) | Seventh (2004–2014) | Eighth (2011–2020) | | Ninth (2017–present) |
|---|---|---|---|---|---|---|---|---|
| Asus | | | | | | | | ROG Xbox Ally (Note: Co-developed with Microsoft) |
| Atari | | Atari Lynx (2 million) | | | | | | |
| Bandai | | | | WonderSwan (3.50 million) | | | | |
| Milton Bradley | Microvision | | | | | | | |
| NEC | | TurboExpress (1.5 million) | | | | | | |
| Nintendo | Game & Watch (43.4 million) | Game Boy (118.69 million) | Game Boy Color (<49.3 million) | Game Boy Advance (81.51 million) | Nintendo DS (154.02 million) | Nintendo 3DS (75.94 million) | Nintendo Switch (Note: A current generation console being manufactured and sold on the market.) (Note: The Switch has been compared and considered to compete with consoles of both the eighth and ninth generation by sources.) (155.37 million) | Nintendo Switch 2 (23.68 million) |
| Nokia | | | | N-Gage (3 million) | | | | |
| Sega | | Game Gear (10.6 million) | Genesis Nomad (~1 million) | | | | | |
| SNK | | | Neo Geo Pocket (2 million) | | | Neo Geo X | | |
| Sony | | | | | PlayStation Portable (>80 million) | PlayStation Vita (16.21 million) | | |
| Valve | | | | | | | | Steam Deck (3.7 million) |

=== Origins ===
The origins of handheld game consoles are found in handheld and tabletop electronic game devices of the 1970s and early 1980s. These electronic devices are capable of playing only a single game, they fit in the palm of the hand or on a tabletop, and they may make use of a variety of video displays such as LED, VFD, or LCD. In 1978, handheld electronic games were described by Popular Electronics magazine as "nonvideo electronic games" and "non-TV games" as distinct from devices that required use of a television screen. Handheld electronic games, in turn, find their origins in the synthesis of previous handheld and tabletop electro-mechanical devices such as Waco's Electronic Tic-Tac-Toe (1972) Cragstan's Periscope-Firing Range (1951), and the emerging optoelectronic-display-driven calculator market of the early 1970s. This synthesis happened in 1976, when "Mattel began work on a line of calculator-sized sports games that became the world's first handheld electronic games. The project began when Michael Katz, Mattel's new product category marketing director, told the engineers in the electronics group to design a game the size of a calculator, using LED (light-emitting diode) technology."

our big success was something that I conceptualized—the first handheld game. I asked the design group to see if they could come up with a game that was electronic that was the same size as a calculator.

—Michael Katz, former marketing director, Mattel Toys.

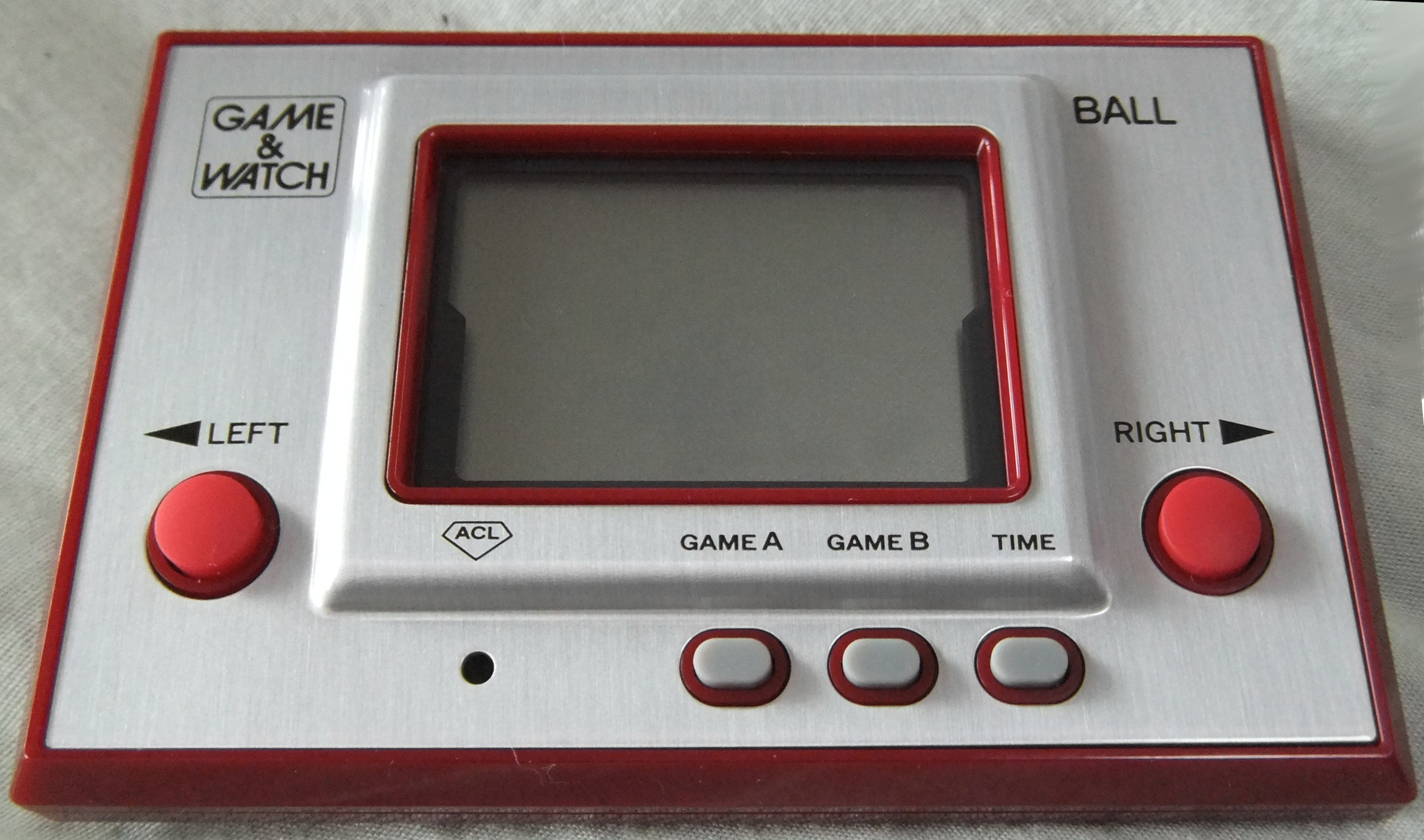
Game & Watch Ball

The result was the 1976 release of Auto Race. Followed by Football later in 1977, the two games were so successful that according to Katz, "these simple electronic handheld games turned into a '$400 million category.'" Mattel would later win the honor of being recognized by the industry for innovation in handheld game device displays. Soon, other manufacturers including Coleco, Parker Brothers, Milton Bradley, Entex, and Bandai began following up with their own tabletop and handheld electronic games.

In 1979 the LCD-based Microvision, designed by Smith Engineering and distributed by Milton-Bradley, became the first handheld game console and the first to use interchangeable game cartridges. The Microvision game Cosmic Hunter (1981) also introduced the concept of a directional pad on handheld gaming devices, and is operated by using the thumb to manipulate the on-screen character in any of four directions.

In 1979, Gunpei Yokoi, traveling on a bullet train, saw a bored businessman playing with an LCD calculator by pressing the buttons. Yokoi then thought of an idea for a watch that doubled as a miniature game machine for killing time. Starting in 1980, Nintendo began to release a series of electronic games designed by Yokoi called the Game & Watch games. Taking advantage of the technology used in the credit-card-sized calculators that had appeared on the market, Yokoi designed the series of LCD-based games to include a digital time display in the corner of the screen. For later, more complicated Game & Watch games, Yokoi invented a cross shaped directional pad or "D-pad" for control of on-screen characters. Yokoi also included his directional pad on the NES controllers, and the cross-shaped thumb controller soon became standard on game console controllers and ubiquitous across the video game industry since. When Yokoi began designing Nintendo's first handheld game console, he came up with a device that married the elements of his Game & Watch devices and the Famicom console, including both items' D-pad controller. The result was the Nintendo Game Boy.

In 1982, the Bandai LCD Solarpower was the first solar-powered gaming device. Some of its games, such as the horror-themed game Terror House, features two LCD panels, one stacked on the other, for an early 3D effect. In 1983, Takara Tomy's Tomytronic 3D simulates 3D by having two LCD panels that were lit by external light through a window on top of the device, making it the first dedicated home video 3D hardware.

=== Beginnings ===
The late 1980s and early 1990s saw the beginnings of the modern-day handheld game console industry, after the demise of the Microvision. As backlit LCD game consoles with color graphics consume a lot of power, they were not battery-friendly like the non-backlit original Game Boy whose monochrome graphics allowed longer battery life. By this point, rechargeable battery technology had not yet matured and so the more advanced game consoles of the time such as the Game Gear and Lynx did not have nearly as much success as the Game Boy.

Even though third-party rechargeable batteries were available for the battery-hungry alternatives to the Game Boy, these batteries employed a nickel-cadmium process and had to be completely discharged before being recharged to ensure maximum efficiency; lead-acid batteries could be used with automobile circuit limiters (cigarette lighter plug devices); but the batteries had mediocre portability. The later NiMH batteries, which do not share this requirement for maximum efficiency, were not released until the late 1990s, years after the Game Gear, Atari Lynx, and original Game Boy had been discontinued. During the time when technologically superior handhelds had strict technical limitations, batteries had a very low mAh rating since batteries with heavy power density were not yet available.

Modern game systems such as the Nintendo DS and PlayStation Portable have rechargeable Lithium-Ion batteries with proprietary shapes. Other seventh-generation consoles, such as the GP2X, use standard alkaline batteries. Because the mAh rating of alkaline batteries has increased since the 1990s, the power needed for handhelds like the GP2X may be supplied by relatively few batteries.

==== Game Boy ====
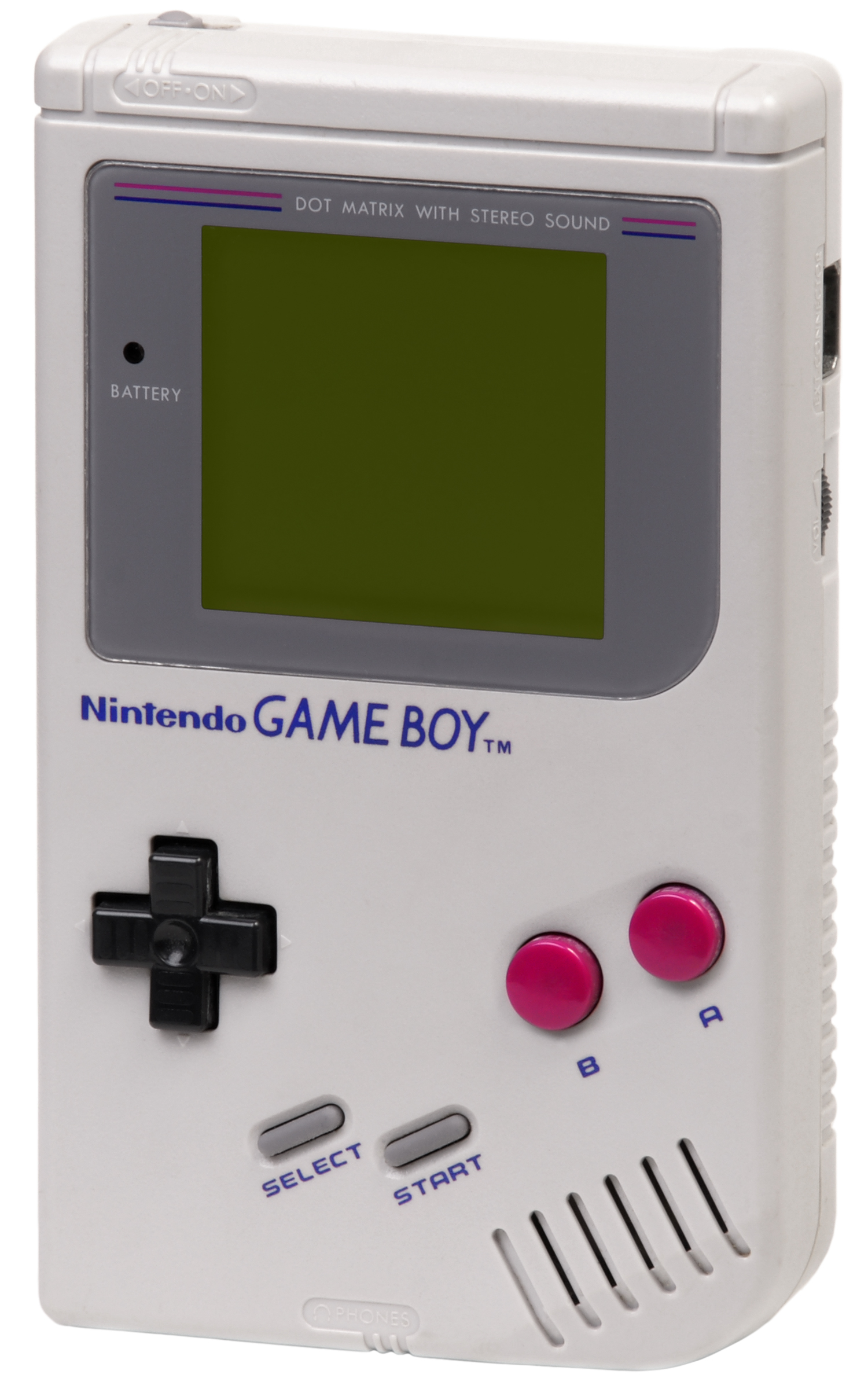
The original Game Boy

Nintendo released the Game Boy on April 21, 1989. The design team headed by Gunpei Yokoi had also been responsible for the Game & Watch system, as well as the Nintendo Entertainment System games Metroid and Kid Icarus. The Game Boy came under scrutiny by Nintendo president Hiroshi Yamauchi, saying that the monochrome screen was too small, and the processing power was inadequate. The design team had felt that low initial cost and battery economy were more important concerns, and when compared to the Microvision, the Game Boy was a huge leap forward.

Yokoi recognized that the Game Boy needed a killer app—at least one game that would define the console, and persuade customers to buy it. In June 1988, Minoru Arakawa, then-CEO of Nintendo of America saw a demonstration of the game Tetris at a trade show. Nintendo purchased the rights for the game, and packaged it with the Game Boy system as a launch title. It was almost an immediate hit. By the end of the year more than a million units were sold in the US. As of March 31, 2005, the Game Boy and Game Boy Color combined to sell over 118 million units worldwide.

==== Atari Lynx ====
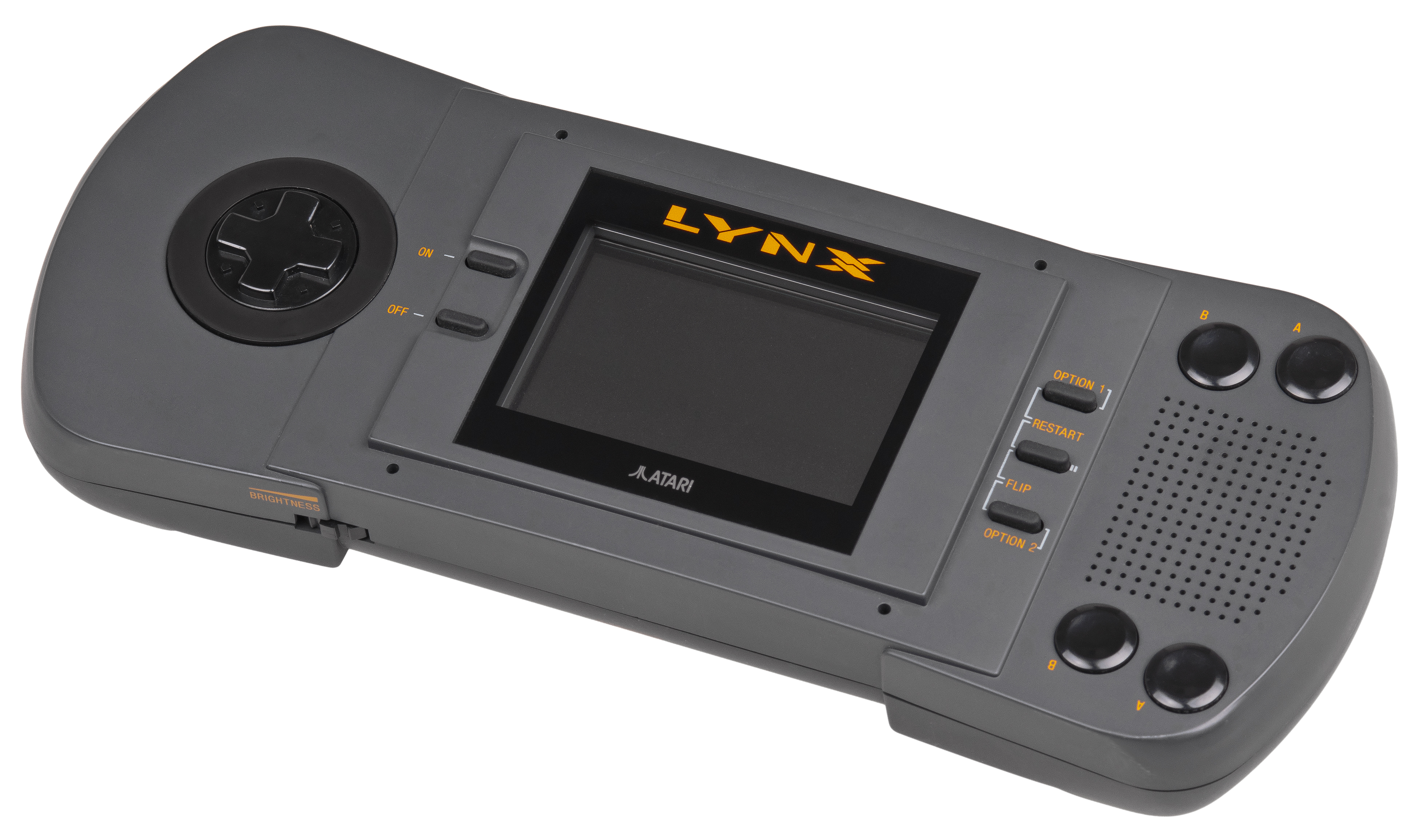
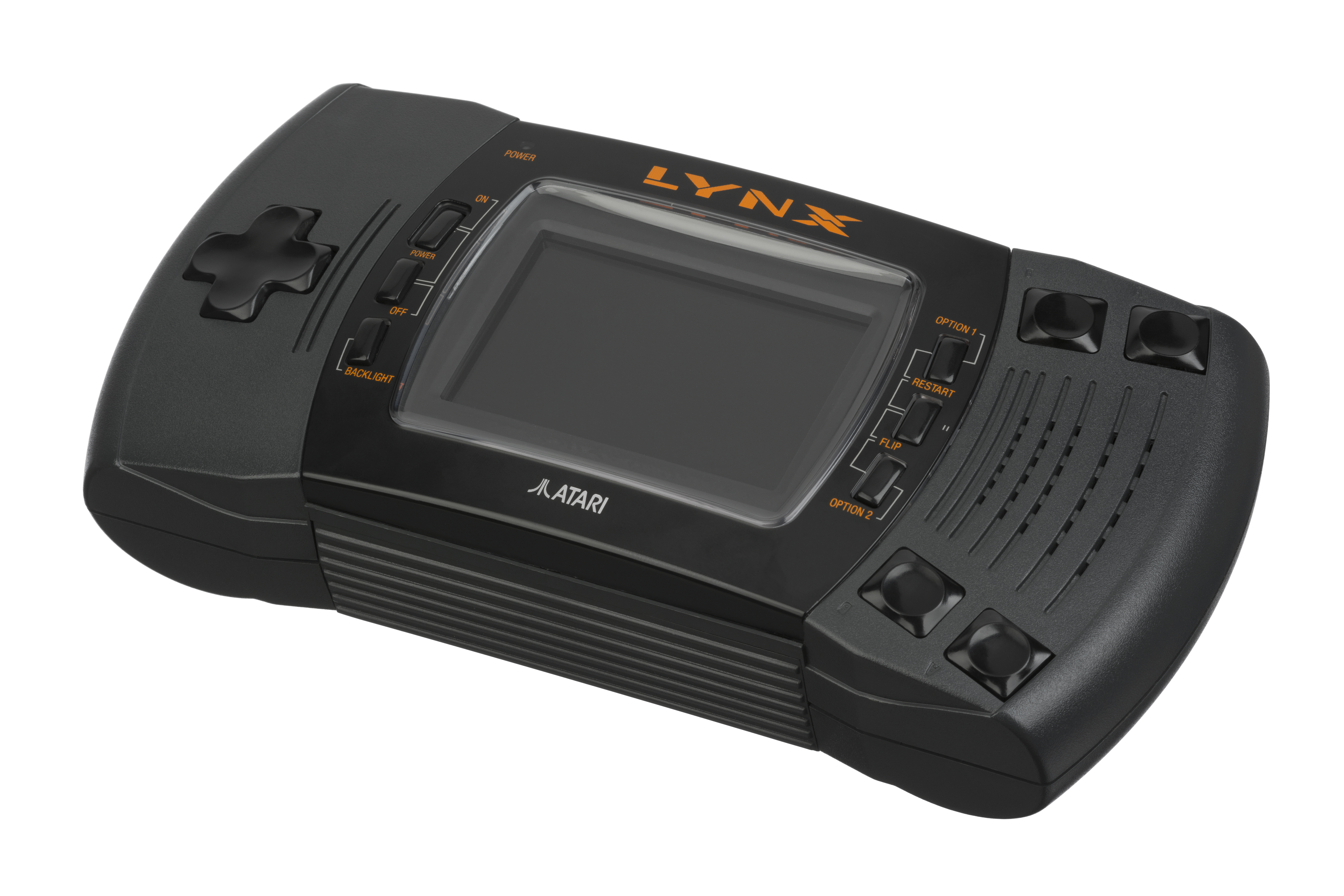
Atari Lynx I and II

In 1987, Epyx created the Handy Game, a device that would become the Atari Lynx, released on September 1, 1989. It was the first color handheld console ever made, as well as the first with a backlit screen. It also featured networking support with up to 17 other players, and advanced hardware that allowed the zooming and scaling of sprites. The Lynx could also be turned upside down to accommodate left-handed players. However, all of these features came at a high price point, which drove consumers to seek cheaper alternatives. The Lynx was also unwieldy, consumed batteries quickly, and lacked the third-party support enjoyed by its competitors. Due to its high price, short battery life, production shortages, a dearth of compelling games, and Nintendo's aggressive marketing campaign, and despite a redesign in 1991, the Lynx became a commercial failure. Despite this, companies like Telegames helped to keep the system alive long past its commercial relevance, and when new owner Hasbro released the rights to develop for the public domain, independent developers like Songbird have managed to release new commercial games for the system every year until 2004's Winter Games.

==== TurboExpress ====
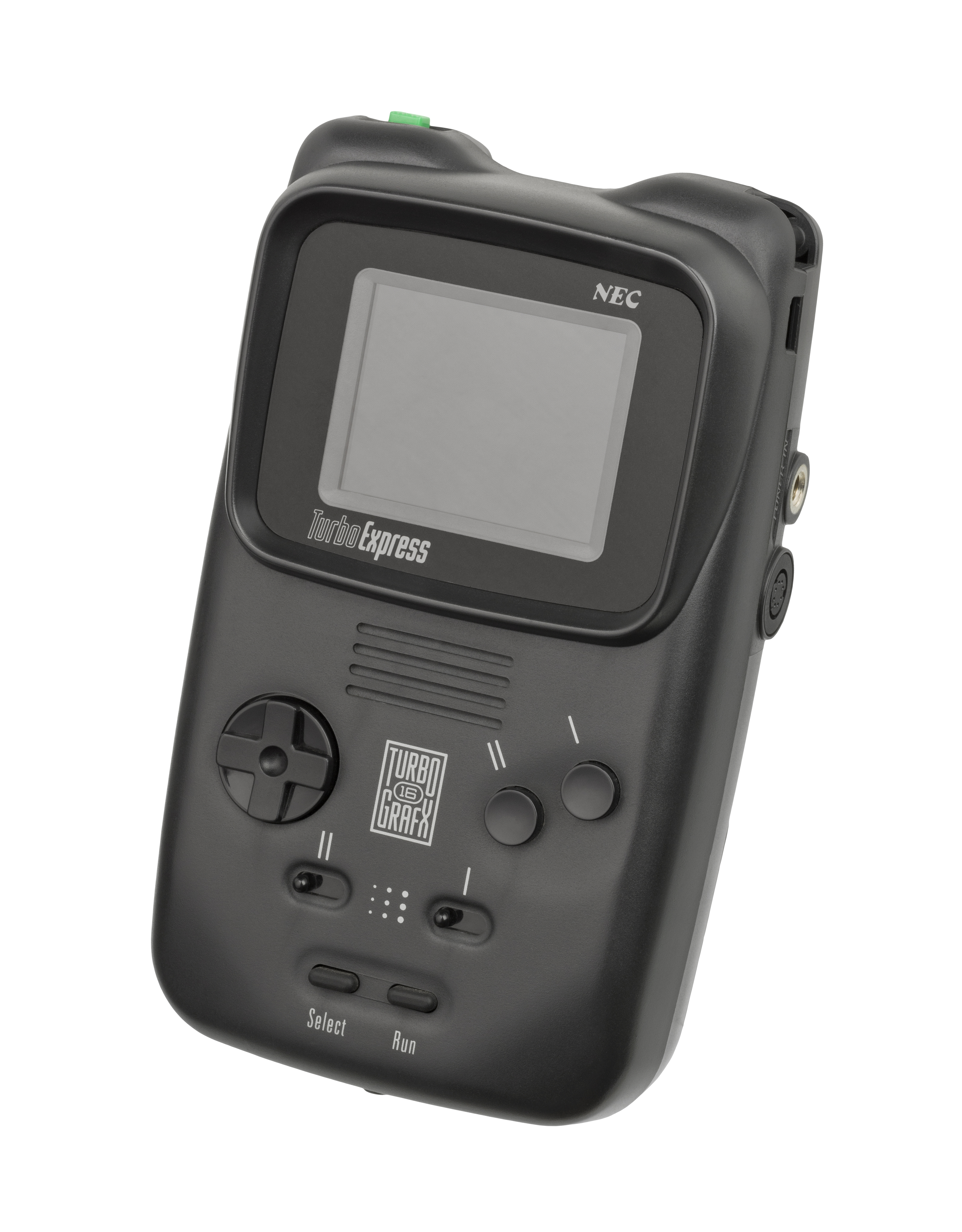
TurboExpress handheld

The TurboExpress was a portable version of the TurboGrafx, released in December 1990 for $249.99. Its Japanese equivalent was the PC Engine GT.

It was the most advanced handheld of its time and could play all the TurboGrafx-16's games (which are on a small, credit-card-sized media called HuCards). It had a 66 mm (2.6 in.) screen, the same as the original Game Boy, but in a much higher resolution, and could display 64 sprites at once: 16 per scanline, in 512 colors (although the hardware could only handle 481 simultaneous colors). It had 8 kilobytes of RAM. The Turbo ran on the HuC6820 CPU at 1.79 or 7.16 MHz.

The optional "TurboVision" TV tuner included an RCA audio/video input allowing users to use TurboExpress as a video monitor. The "TurboLink" allowed two-player play. Falcon, a flight simulator, included a "head-to-head" dogfight mode that could only be accessed via TurboLink. However, very few TG-16 games offered co-op play modes especially designed with the TurboExpress in mind.

==== Bitcorp Gamate ====
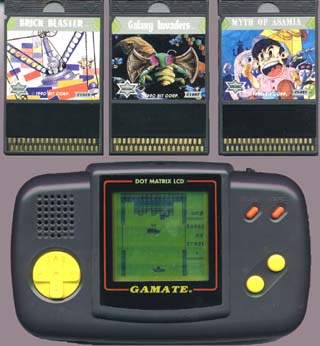
Gamate and game cards

The Bitcorp Gamate was one of the first handheld game systems created in response to the Nintendo Game Boy. It was released in Asia in 1990 and distributed worldwide by 1991.

Like the Game Gear, it was horizontal in orientation and like the Game Boy, required 4 AA batteries. Unlike many later Game Boy clones, its internal components were professionally assembled (no "glop-top" chips). Unfortunately the system's fatal flaw was its screen. Even by the standards of the day, its screen was rather difficult to use, suffering from similar ghosting problems that were common complaints with the first generation Game Boys. Likely because of this fact, sales were quite poor, and Bitcorp closed by 1992. However, new games continued to be published for the Asian market, possibly as late as 1994. The total number of games released for the system remains unknown.

Gamate games were designed for stereo sound, but the console was only equipped with a mono speaker.

==== Game Gear ====
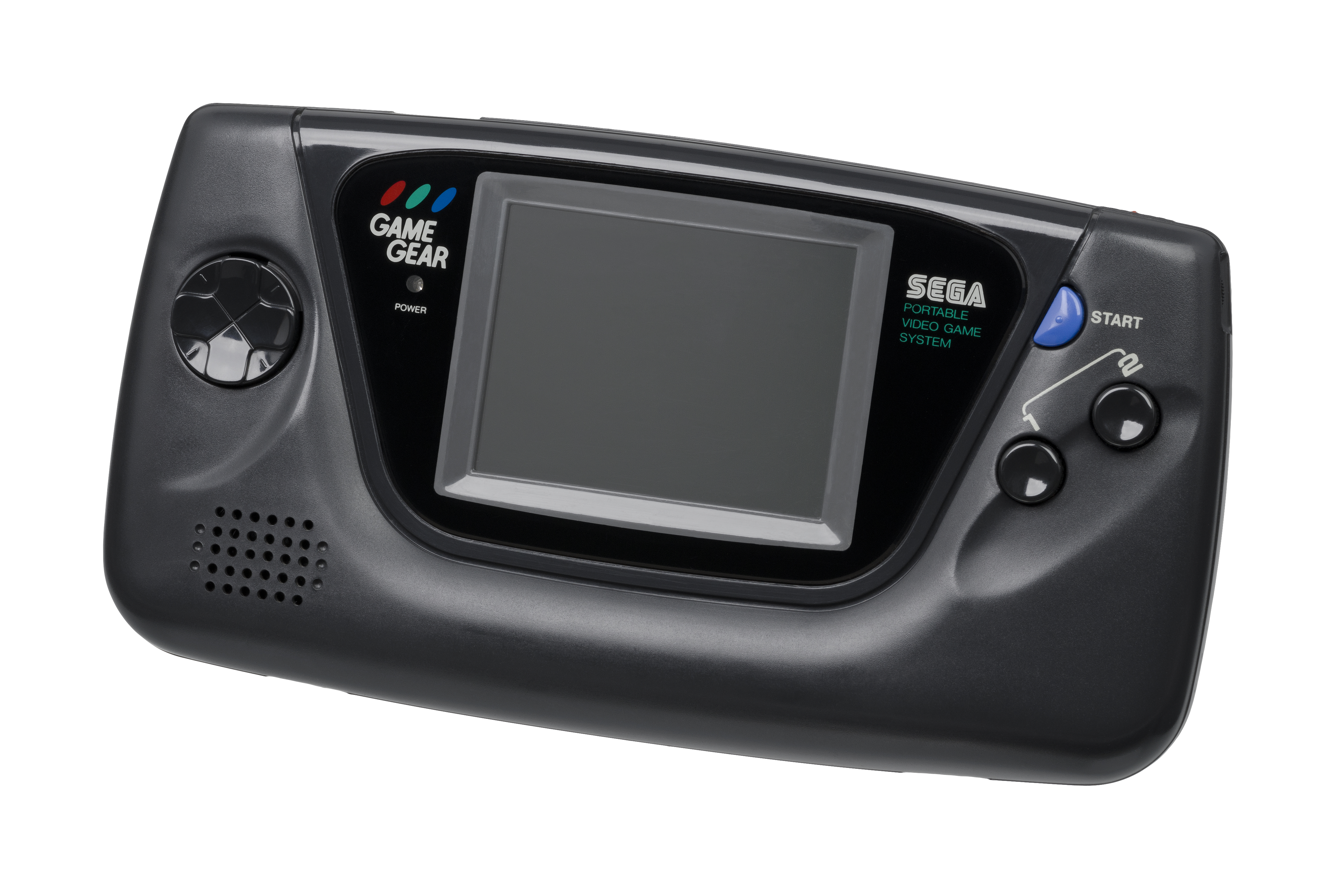
Game Gear

The Game Gear was the first color handheld console produced by Sega. Released in Japan on October 6, 1990 and in North America and Europe in April 1991, it was based on the Master System, which gave Sega the ability to quickly create Game Gear games from its large library of games for the Master System. While never reaching the level of success enjoyed by Nintendo, the Game Gear proved to be a fairly durable competitor, lasting longer than any other Game Boy rivals.

While the Game Gear was most frequently seen in black or navy blue, it was also released in a variety of additional colors: red, light blue, yellow, violet, and transparent. All of these variations were released in small quantities and frequently only in the Asian market.

Following Sega's success with the Game Gear they began development on a successor during the early 1990s which was intended to feature a touchscreen interface, many years before the Nintendo DS. However, such a technology was very expensive at the time, and the handheld itself was estimated to have cost around $289 were it to be released. Sega eventually chose to shelve the idea and instead release the Genesis Nomad, a handheld version of the Genesis, as the successor.

==== Watara Supervision ====
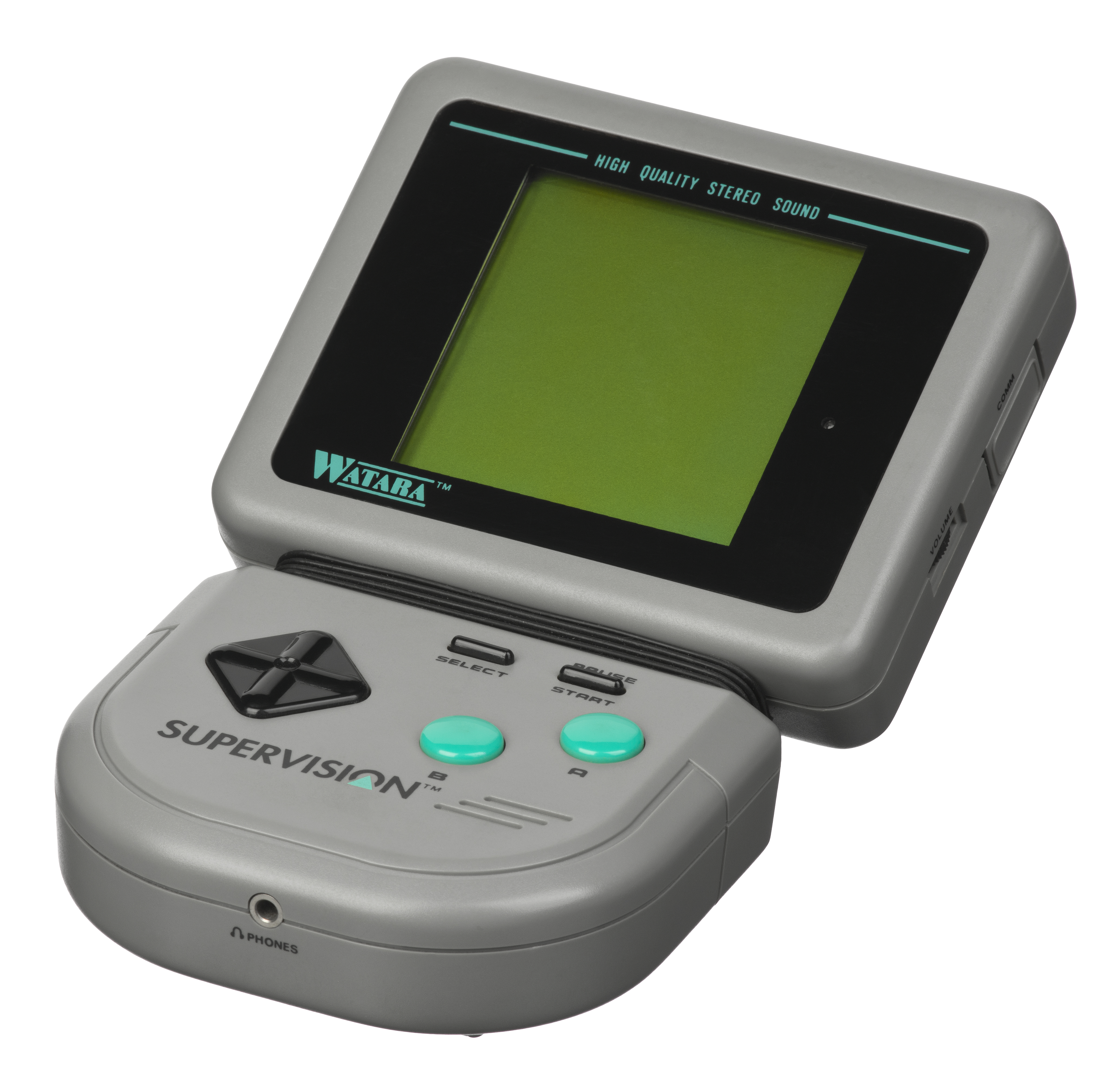
The Watara Supervision with tilting screen

The Watara SuperVision was released in 1992 in an attempt to compete with the Nintendo Game Boy. The first model was designed very much like a Game Boy, but was grey in color and had a slightly larger screen. The second model was made with a hinge across the center and could be bent slightly to provide greater comfort for the user. While the system did enjoy a modest degree of success, it never impacted the sales of Nintendo or Sega. The SuperVision was redesigned a final time as "The Magnum". Released in limited quantities it was roughly equivalent to the Game Boy Pocket. It was available in three colors: yellow, green and grey. Watara designed many of the games themselves, but did receive some third-party support, most notably from Sachen.

A TV adapter was available in both PAL and NTSC formats that could transfer the Supervision's black-and-white palette to 4 colors, similar in some regards to the Super Game Boy from Nintendo.

==== Hartung Game Master ====
The Hartung Game Master was an obscure handheld released at an unknown point in the early 1990s. Its graphics fidelity was much lower than most of its contemporaries, displaying just 64x64 pixels. It was available in black, white, and purple, and was frequently rebranded by its distributors, such as Delplay, Videojet and Systema.

The exact number of games released is not known, but was likely around 20. The system most frequently turns up in Europe and Australia.

=== Late 1990s ===
By this time, the lack of significant development in Nintendo's product line began allowing more advanced systems such as the Neo Geo Pocket Color and the WonderSwan Color to be developed.

==== Sega Genesis Nomad ====
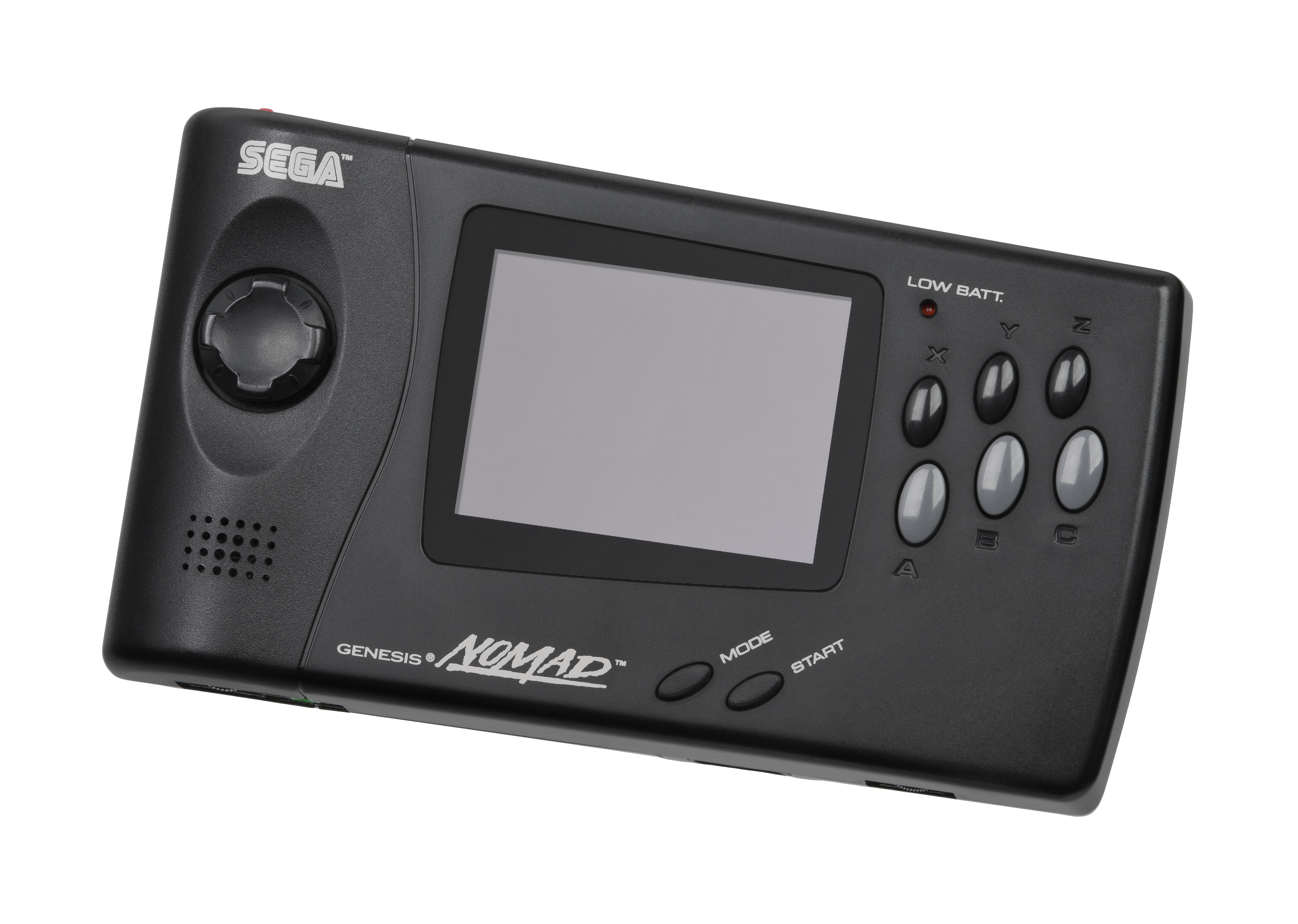
Sega Nomad

The Nomad was released in October 1995 in North America only. The release was six years into the market span of the Genesis, with an existing library of more than 500 Genesis games. According to former Sega of America research and development head Joe Miller, the Nomad was not intended to be the Game Gear's replacement; he believed that there was little planning from Sega of Japan for the new handheld. Sega was supporting five different consoles: Saturn, Genesis, Game Gear, Pico, and the Master System, as well as the Sega CD and 32X add-ons. In Japan, the Mega Drive had never been successful and the Saturn was more successful than Sony's PlayStation, so Sega Enterprises CEO Hayao Nakayama decided to focus on the Saturn. By 1999, the Nomad was being sold at less than a third of its original price.

==== Game Boy Pocket ====
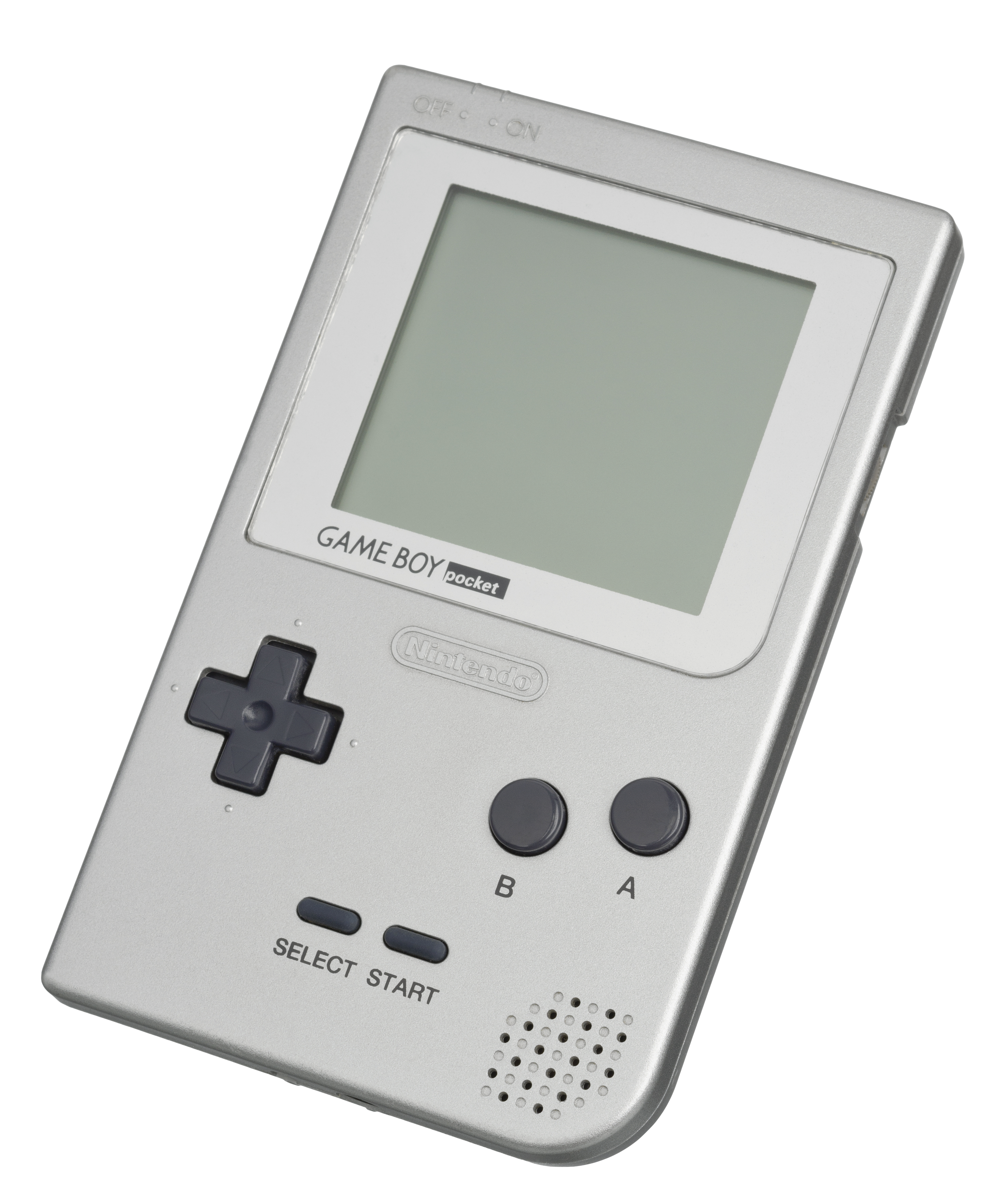
The 1st release Game Boy Pocket

The Game Boy Pocket was a redesigned version of the original Game Boy having the same features. It was released on July 20, 1996. Notably, this variation was smaller and lighter. It came in seven different colors: red, yellow, green, blue, pink, black, silver and transparent. It was powered by two AAA batteries, which provided approximately 10 hours of gameplay. The screen was changed to a true black-and-white display, rather than the "pea soup" monochromatic display of the original Game Boy. Although, like its predecessor, the Game Boy Pocket had no backlight to allow play in a darkened area, it did notably improve visibility and pixel response-time (mostly eliminating ghosting).

The first model of the Game Boy Pocket did not have an LED to show battery levels, but the feature was added due to public demand. The Game Boy Pocket was not a new software platform and played the same software as the original Game Boy model.

==== Game.com ====
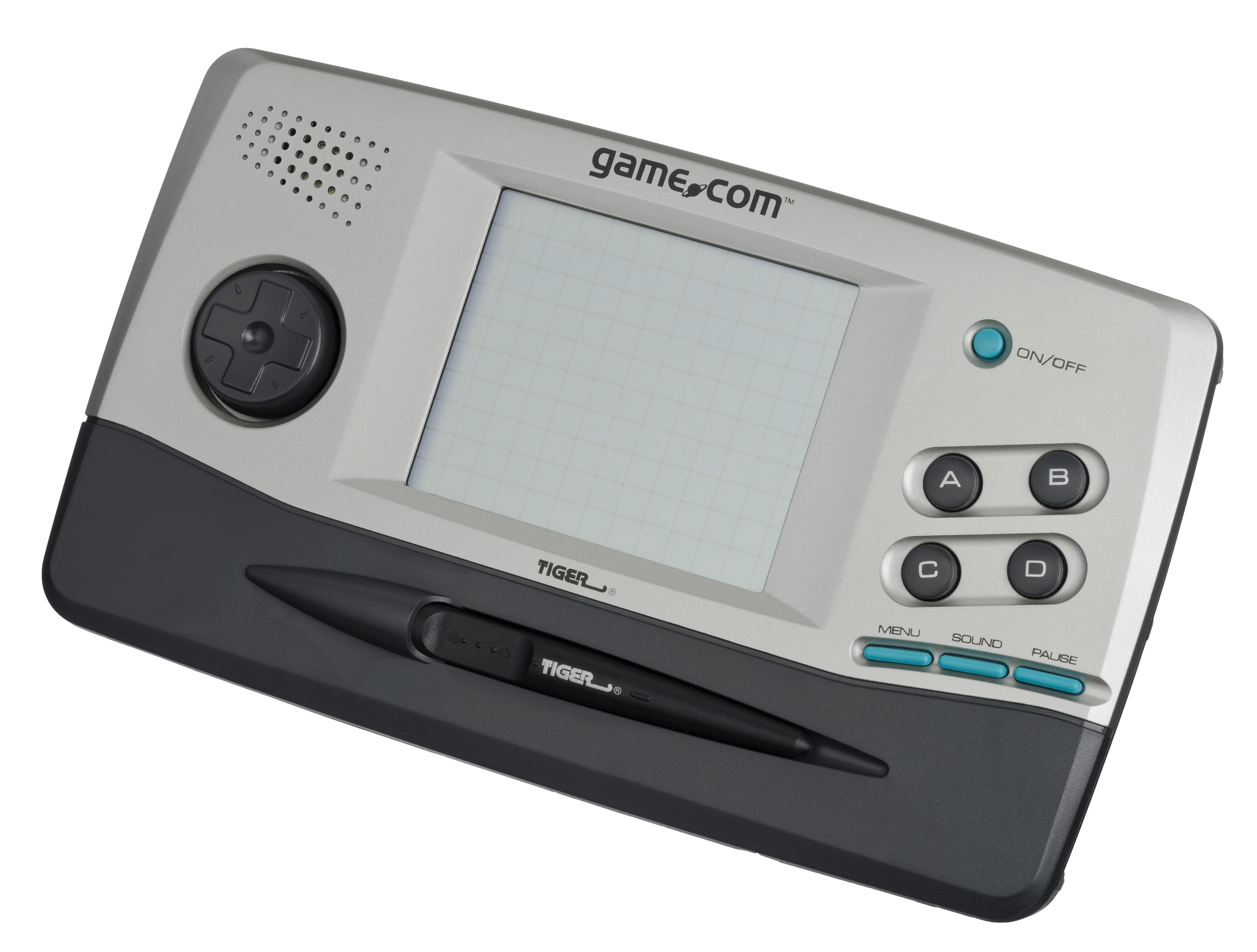
Game.com

The Game.com was a handheld game console released by Tiger Electronics on September 12, 1997. It featured many new ideas for handheld consoles and was aimed at an older target audience, sporting PDA-style features and functions such as a touch screen and stylus.

==== Game Boy Color ====
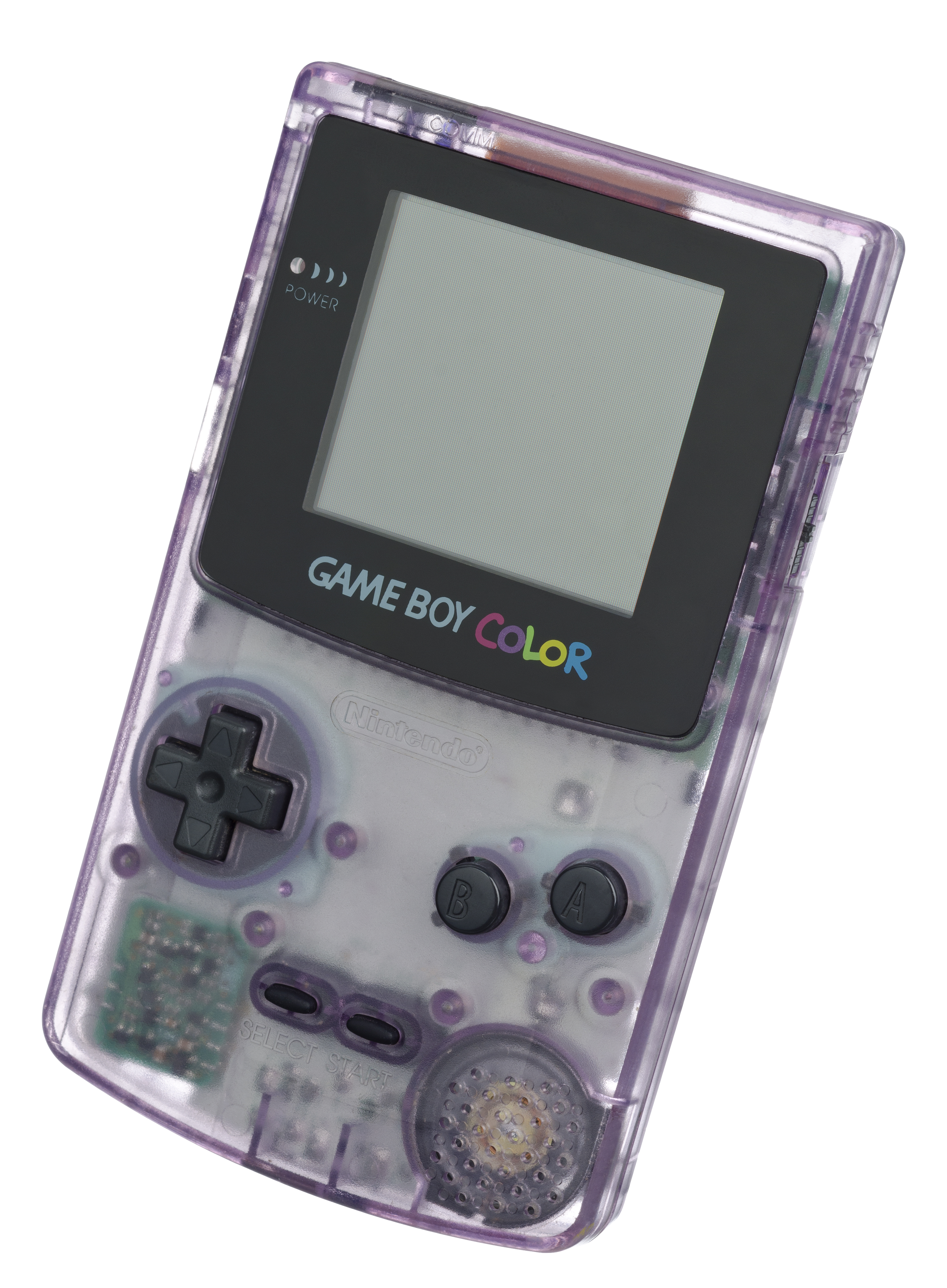
The Game Boy Color was the first handheld by Nintendo featuring Colors.

The Game Boy Color (also referred to as GBC or CGB) was Nintendo's successor to the Game Boy and was released on October 21, 1998, in Japan and in November of the same year in the United States. It featured a color screen and was slightly bigger than the Game Boy Pocket. The processor was twice as fast as a Game Boy's and had twice as much memory. It also had an infrared communications port for wireless linking which did not appear in later versions of the Game Boy, such as the Game Boy Advance.

The Game Boy Color was a response to pressure from game developers for a new system, as they felt that the Game Boy, even in its latest incarnation (the Game Boy Pocket) was insufficient. The resulting product was backward-compatible, a first for a handheld console system, and this leveraged the large library of games and the existing user base of the predecessor system. This became a major feature of the Game Boy line since it allowed each new launch to begin with a significantly larger library than any of its competitors. As of March 31, 2005, the Game Boy and Game Boy Color combined to sell 118.69 million units worldwide.

The console was capable of displaying up to 56 different colors simultaneously on screen from its palette of 32,768, and could add basic four-color shading to games that had been developed for the original Game Boy. It could also give the sprites and backgrounds separate colors, for a total of more than four colors.

==== Neo Geo Pocket Color ====
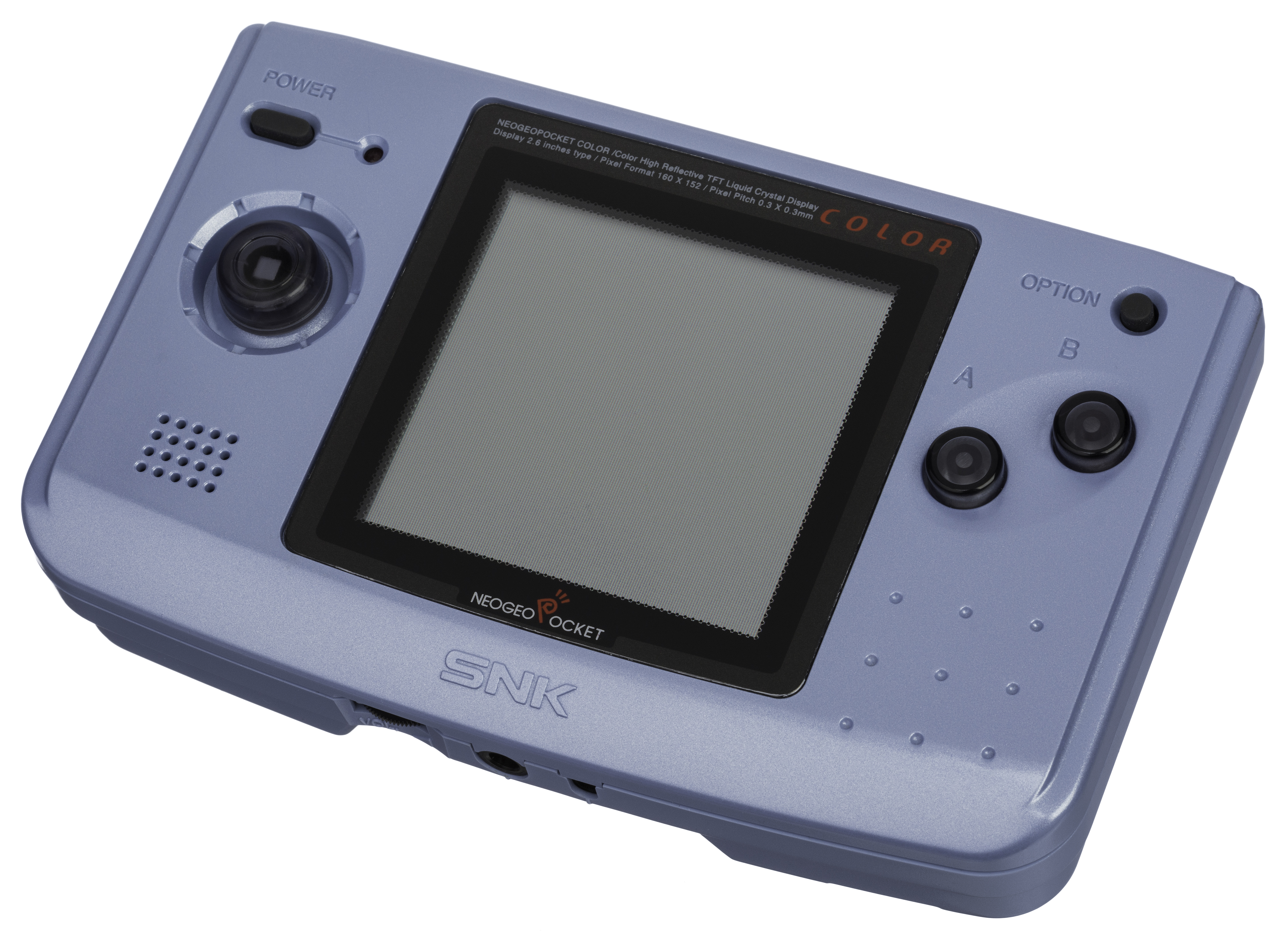
Neo Geo Pocket Color

The Neo Geo Pocket Color (or NGPC) was released on March 19, 1999 in Japan, and later that year in the United States and Europe on August 6 and October 1, respectively. It was a 16-bit color handheld game console designed by SNK, the maker of the Neo Geo home console and arcade machine. It came after SNK's original Neo Geo Pocket monochrome handheld, which debuted in 1998 in Japan.

In 2000, following SNK's purchase by Japanese Pachinko manufacturer Aruze, the Neo Geo Pocket Color was dropped from both the US and European markets, purportedly due to commercial failure.

The system seemed well on its way to being a success in the U.S. It was more successful than any Game Boy competitor since Sega's Game Gear, but was hurt by several factors, such as SNK's infamous lack of communication with third-party developers, and anticipation of the Game Boy Advance. The decision to ship U.S. games in cardboard boxes in a cost-cutting move rather than hard plastic cases that Japanese and European releases were shipped in may have also hurt US sales.

==== Wonderswan ====
The WonderSwan was a handheld game console designed by Bandai. It was released on March 4, 1999, in Japan.

=== Early 2000s ===
The 2000s saw a major leap in innovation, particularly in the second half with the release of the DS and PSP.

==== Wonderswan Color ====
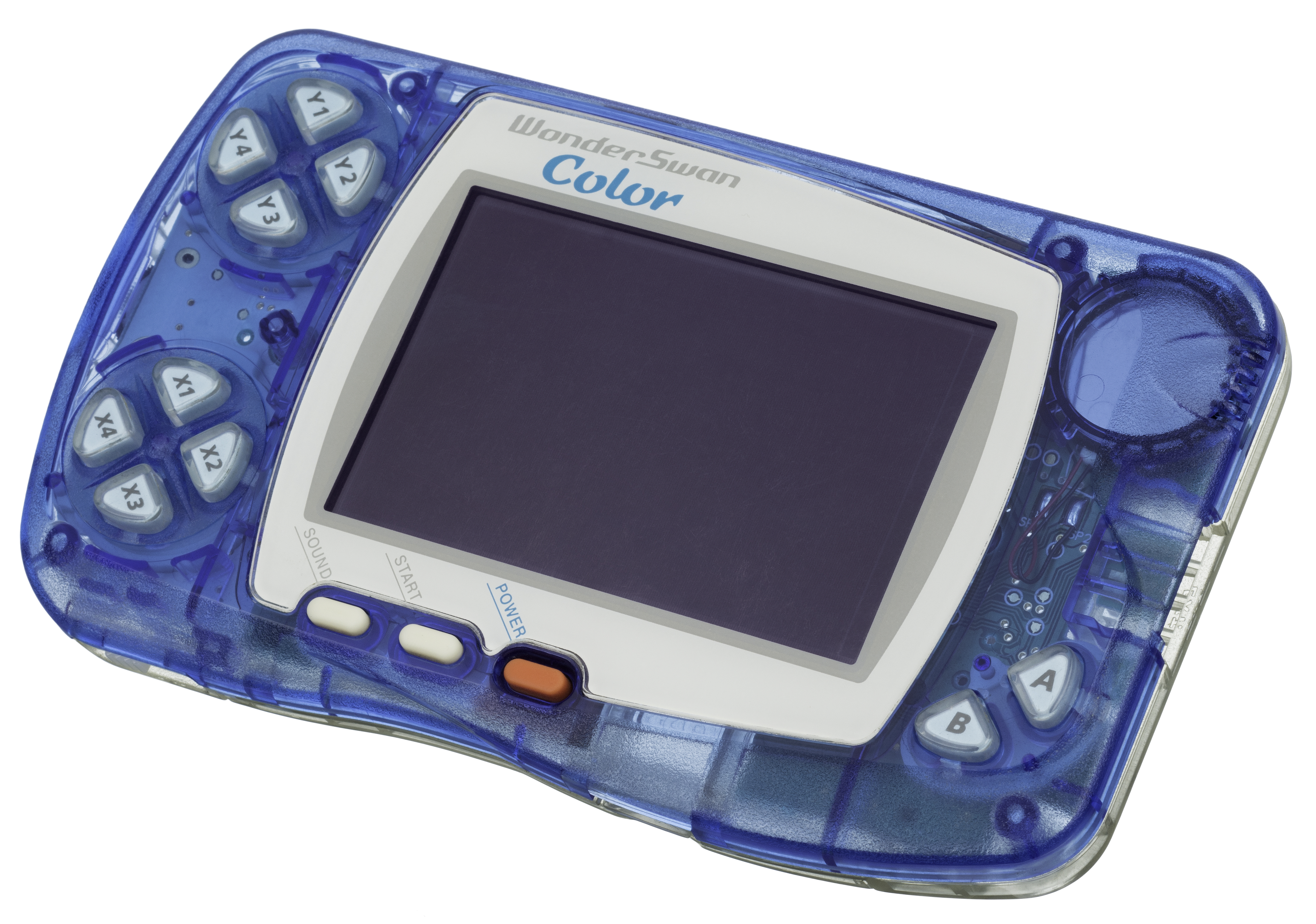
The Wonderswan Color

The WonderSwan Color was a handheld game console designed by Bandai. It was released on December 9, 2000, in Japan, Although the WonderSwan Color was slightly larger and heavier (7 mm and 2 g) compared to the original WonderSwan, the color version featured 512 KB of RAM and a larger color LCD screen. In addition, the WonderSwan Color was compatible with the original WonderSwan library of games.

Before WonderSwan's release, Nintendo had virtually a monopoly in the Japanese video game handheld market. After the release of the WonderSwan Color, Bandai took approximately 8% of the market share in Japan partly due to its low price of 6800 yen (approximately US$65). Another reason for the WonderSwan's success in Japan was that Bandai managed to get a deal with Square to port over the original Famicom Final Fantasy games with improved graphics and controls. However, with the popularity of the Game Boy Advance and the reconciliation between Square and Nintendo, the WonderSwan Color and its successor, the SwanCrystal quickly lost its competitive advantage.

==== Game Boy Advance ====
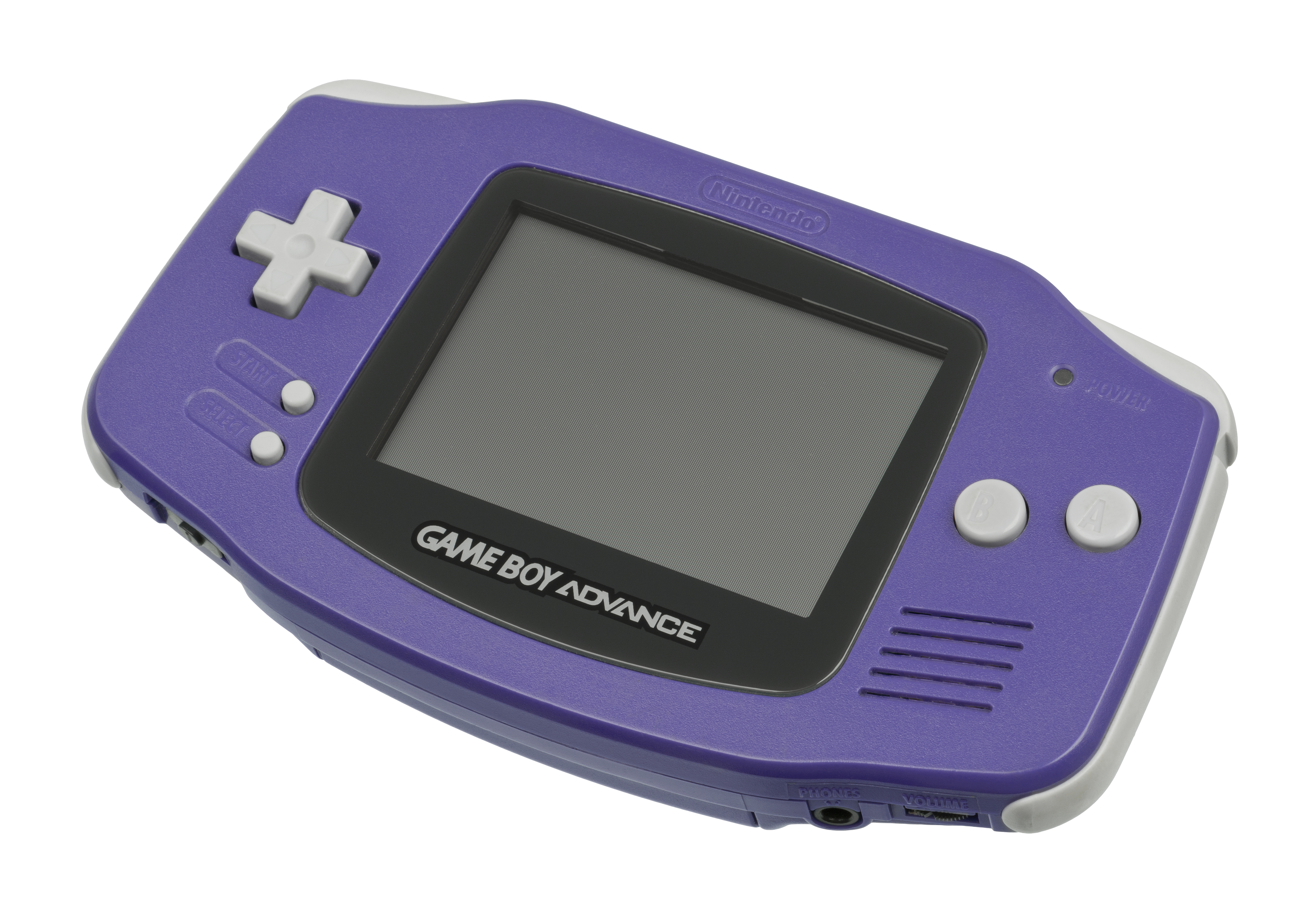
The Game Boy Advance was a major upgrade to the Game Boy line.

On March 21, 2001, Nintendo released the Game Boy Advance (GBA or AGB), which added two shoulder buttons, a larger screen, and more computing power than the Game Boy Color.

The design was revised two years later when the Game Boy Advance SP (GBA SP), a more compact version, was released. The SP featured a "clamshell" design (folding open and closed, like a laptop computer), as well as a frontlit color display and rechargeable battery. Despite the smaller form factor, the screen remained the same size as that of the original. In 2005, the Game Boy Micro was released. This revision sacrificed screen size and backwards compatibility with previous Game Boys for a dramatic reduction in total size and a brighter backlit screen. A new SP model with a backlit screen was released in some regions around the same time.

Along with the GameCube, the GBA also introduced the concept of "connectivity": using a handheld system as a console controller. A handful of games used this feature, most notably Animal Crossing, Pac-Man Vs., Final Fantasy Crystal Chronicles, The Legend of Zelda: Four Swords Adventures, The Legend of Zelda: The Wind Waker, Metroid Prime, and Sonic Adventure 2: Battle.

As of December 31, 2007, the GBA, GBA SP, and the Game Boy Micro combined sold 80.72 million units worldwide.

==== Game Park 32 ====
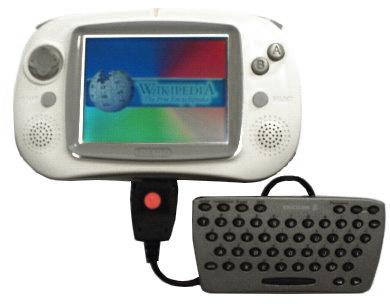
GP32

The original GP32 was released on November 23, 2001 by the South Korean company Game Park a few months after the launch of the Game Boy Advance. It featured a 32-bit CPU, 133 MHz processor, MP3 and Divx player, and e-book reader. SmartMedia cards were used for storage, and could hold up to 128mb of anything downloaded through a USB cable from a PC. The GP32 was redesigned in 2003. A front-lit screen was added and the new version was called GP32 FLU (Front Light Unit). In summer 2004, another redesign, the GP32 BLU, was made, and added a backlit screen. This version of the handheld was planned for release outside South Korea; in Europe, it was released for example in Spain (VirginPlay was the distributor). While not a commercial success on the same level as mainstream handhelds (only 30,000 units were sold), it ended up being used mainly as a platform for user-made applications and emulators of other systems, being popular with developers and more technically adept users.

==== N-Gage ====
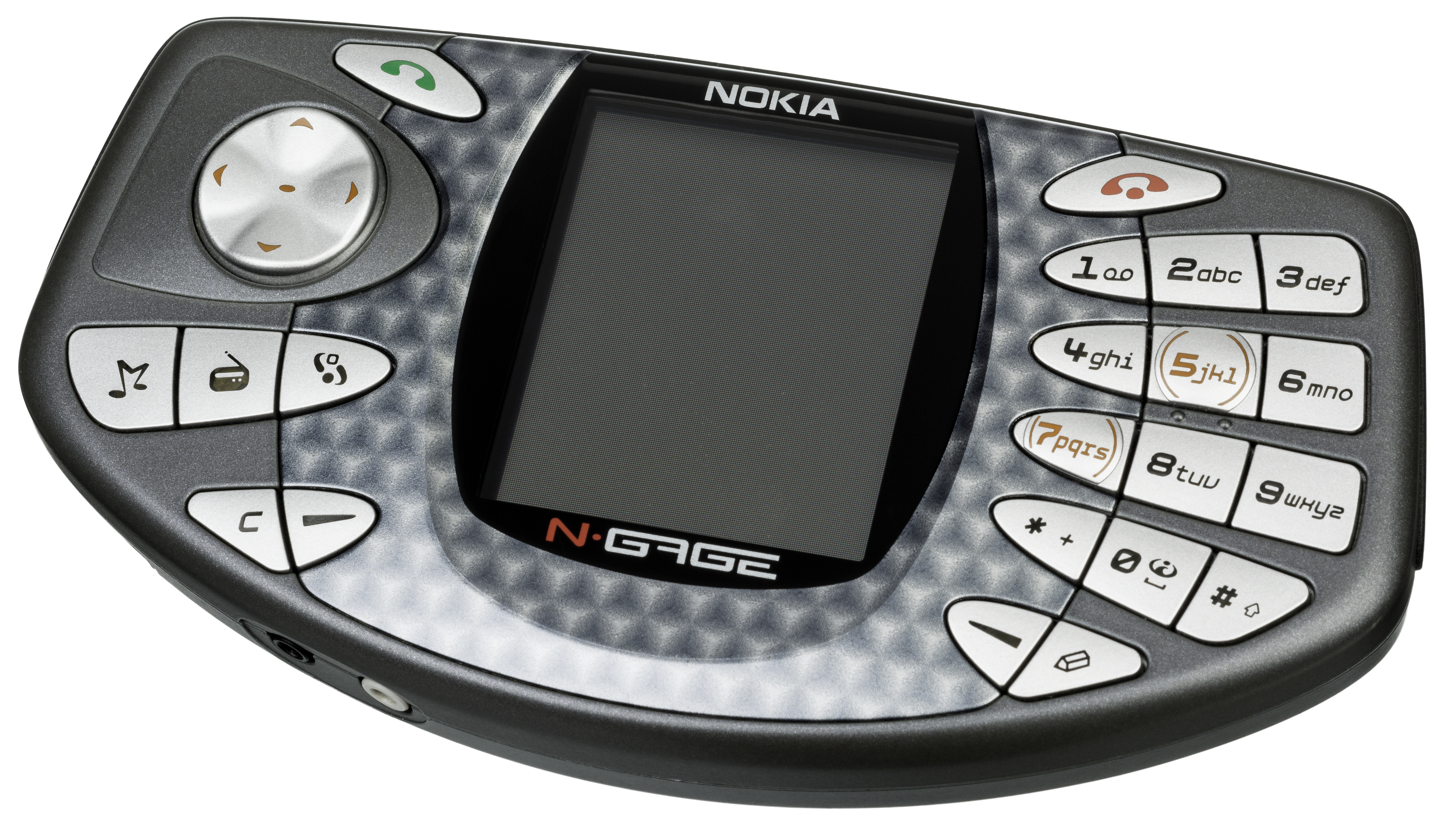
N-Gage

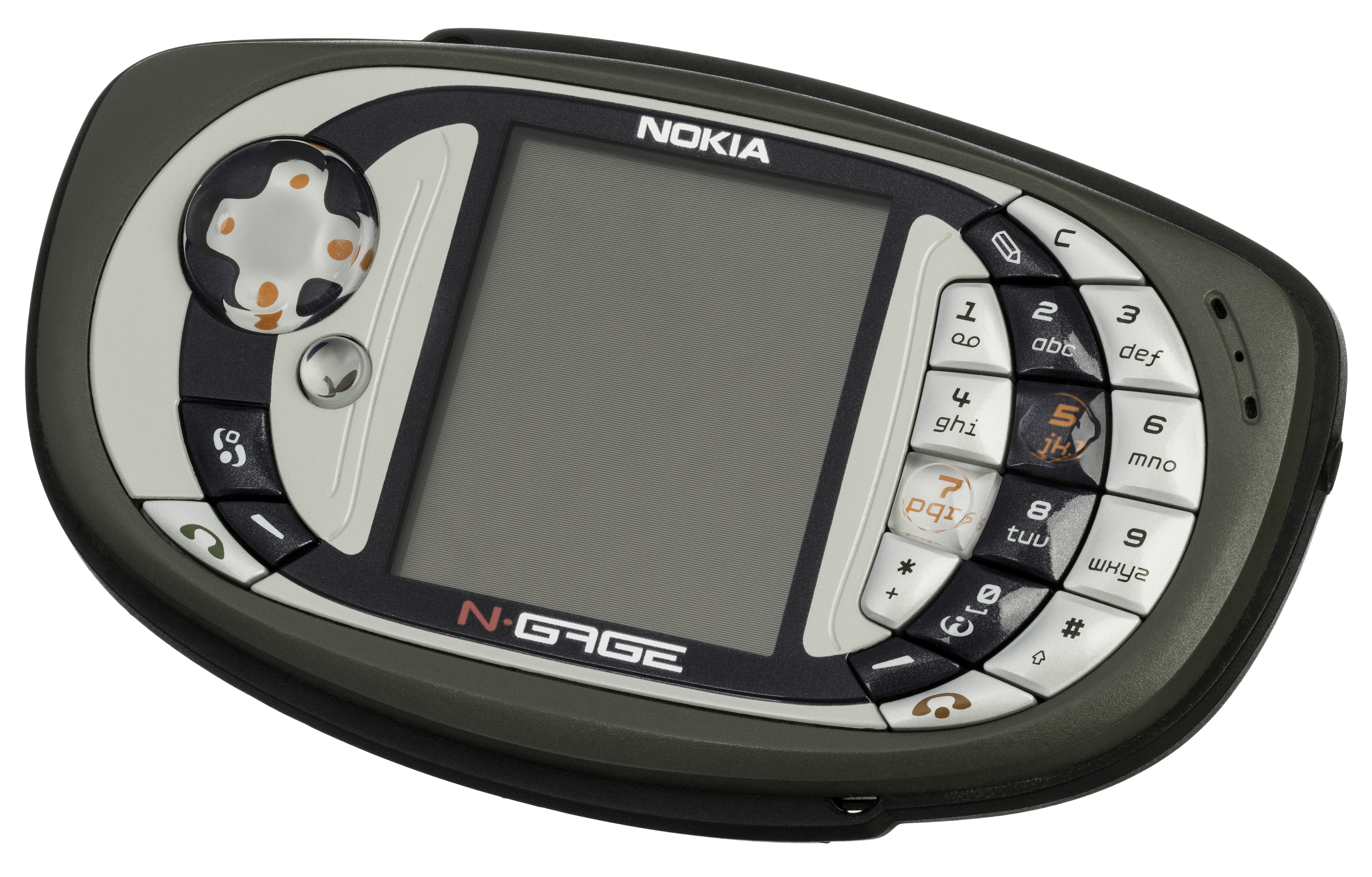
N-Gage QD

Nokia released the N-Gage on October 7, 2003. It was designed as a combination MP3 player, cellphone, PDA, radio, and gaming device. The system received much criticism alleging defects in its physical design and layout, including its vertically oriented screen and requirement of removing the battery to change game cartridges. The most well-known of these was "sidetalking", or the act of placing the phone speaker and receiver on an edge of the device instead of one of the flat sides, causing the user to appear as if they are speaking into a taco.

The N-Gage QD was later released to address the design flaws of the original. However, certain features available in the original N-Gage, including MP3 playback, FM radio reception, and USB connectivity were removed.

Second generation of N-Gage launched on April 3, 2008 in the form of a service for selected Nokia Smartphones.

==== Tapwave Zodiac ====
On November 1, 2003, Tapwave released the Zodiac. It was designed to be a PDA-handheld game console hybrid. It supported photos, movies, music, Internet, and documents. The Zodiac used a special version of Palm OS 5, 5.2T, that supported the special gaming buttons and graphics chip. Two versions were available, Zodiac 1 and 2, differing in memory and looks. The Zodiac line ended on July 31, 2005 when Tapwave declared bankruptcy.

=== Mid 2000s ===
==== Nintendo DS ====
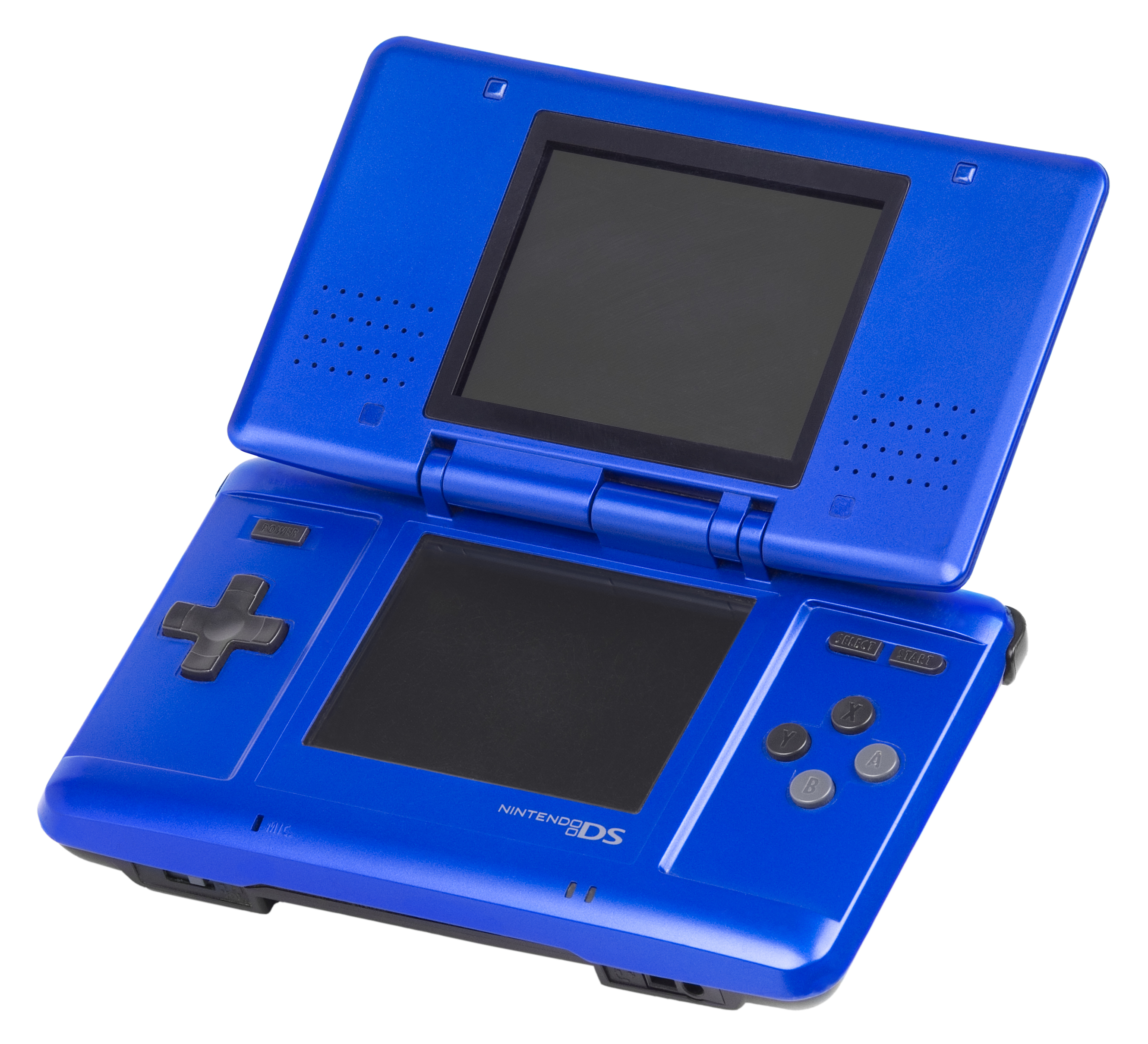
The Nintendo DS has two screens (the lower of which is a touchscreen), a microphone and Wi-Fi connectivity.

The Nintendo DS was released on November 21, 2004. Among its new features were the incorporation of two screens, a touchscreen, wireless connectivity, and a microphone port. As with the Game Boy Advance SP, the DS features a clamshell design, with the two screens aligned vertically on either side of the hinge.

The DS's lower screen is touch-sensitive, designed to be pressed with a stylus, a user's finger or a special "thumb pad" (a small plastic pad attached to the console's wrist strap, which can be affixed to the thumb to simulate an analog stick). More traditional controls include four face buttons, two shoulder buttons, a D-pad, and "Start" and "Select" buttons. The console also features online capabilities via the Nintendo Wi-Fi Connection and ad-hoc wireless networking for multiplayer games with up to sixteen players. It is backwards-compatible with all Game Boy Advance games, but like the Game Boy Micro, it is not compatible with games designed for the Game Boy or Game Boy Color.

In January 2006, Nintendo revealed an updated version of the DS: the Nintendo DS Lite, released on March 2, 2006, with an updated, smaller form factor (42% smaller and 21% lighter than the original Nintendo DS), a cleaner design, longer battery life, and brighter, higher-quality displays, with adjustable brightness. It is also able to connect wirelessly with Nintendo's Wii console.

On October 2, 2008, Nintendo announced the Nintendo DSi, with larger, 3.25-inch screens and two integrated cameras. It has an SD card storage slot in place of the Game Boy Advance slot, plus internal flash memory for storing downloaded games. It was released on November 1, 2008, in Japan, April 2, 2009, in Australia, April 3, 2009, in Europe, and April 5, 2009, in North America. On October 29, 2009, Nintendo announced a larger version of the DSi, called the DSi XL, which was released on November 21, 2009, in Japan, March 5, 2010, in Europe, March 28, 2010, in North America, and April 15, 2010, in Australia.

As of December 31, 2009, the Nintendo DS, Nintendo DS Lite, and Nintendo DSi combined have sold 125.13 million units worldwide.

==== Game King ====
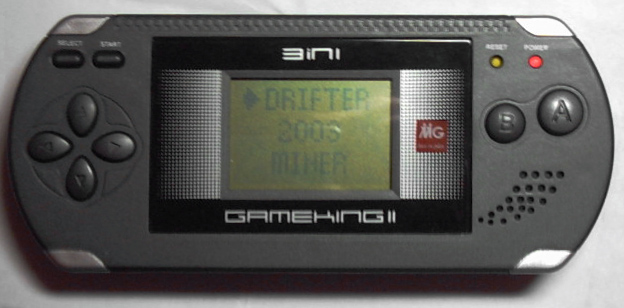
The GameKing 2

The GameKing is a handheld game console released by the Chinese company TimeTop in 2004. The first model while original in design owes a large debt to Nintendo's Game Boy Advance. The second model, the GameKing 2, is believed to be inspired by Sony's PSP. This model also was upgraded with a backlit screen, with a distracting background transparency (which can be removed by opening up the console). A color model, the GameKing 3 apparently exists, but was only made for a brief time and was difficult to purchase outside of Asia.

As many of the games have an "old school" simplicity, the device has developed a small cult following. The GameKing's speaker is quite loud and the cartridges' sophisticated looping soundtracks (sampled from other sources) are seemingly at odds with its primitive graphics.

TimeTop made at least one additional device sometimes labeled as "GameKing", but while it seems to possess more advanced graphics, it is essentially an emulator that plays a handful of multi-carts (like the GB Station Light II). Outside of Asia (especially China) however the GameKing remains relatively unheard of due to the enduring popularity of Japanese handhelds such as those manufactured by Nintendo and Sony.

==== PlayStation Portable ====
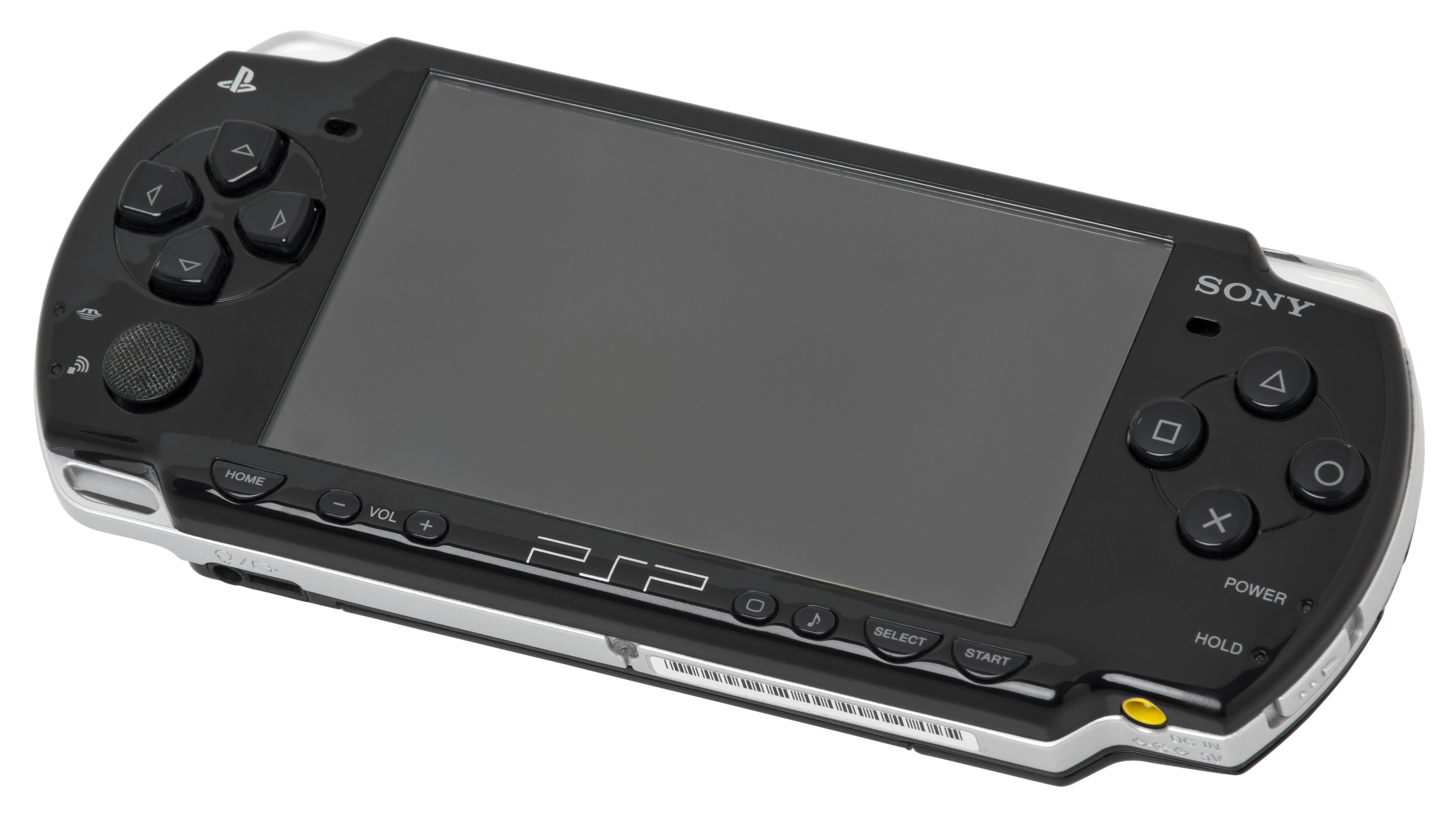
PlayStation Portable

The PlayStation Portable (officially abbreviated PSP) is a handheld game console manufactured and marketed by Sony Computer Entertainment. Development of the console was first announced during E3 2003, and it was unveiled on May 11, 2004, at a Sony press conference before E3 2004. The system was released in Japan on December 12, 2004, in North America on March 24, 2005, and in the PAL region on September 1, 2005.

The PlayStation Portable is the first handheld video game console to use an optical disc format, Universal Media Disc (UMD), for distribution of its games. UMD Video discs with movies and television shows were also released. The PSP utilized the Sony/SanDisk Memory Stick Pro Duo format as its primary storage medium. Other distinguishing features of the console include its large viewing screen, multi-media capabilities, and connectivity with the PlayStation 3, other PSPs, and the Internet.

==== Gizmondo ====
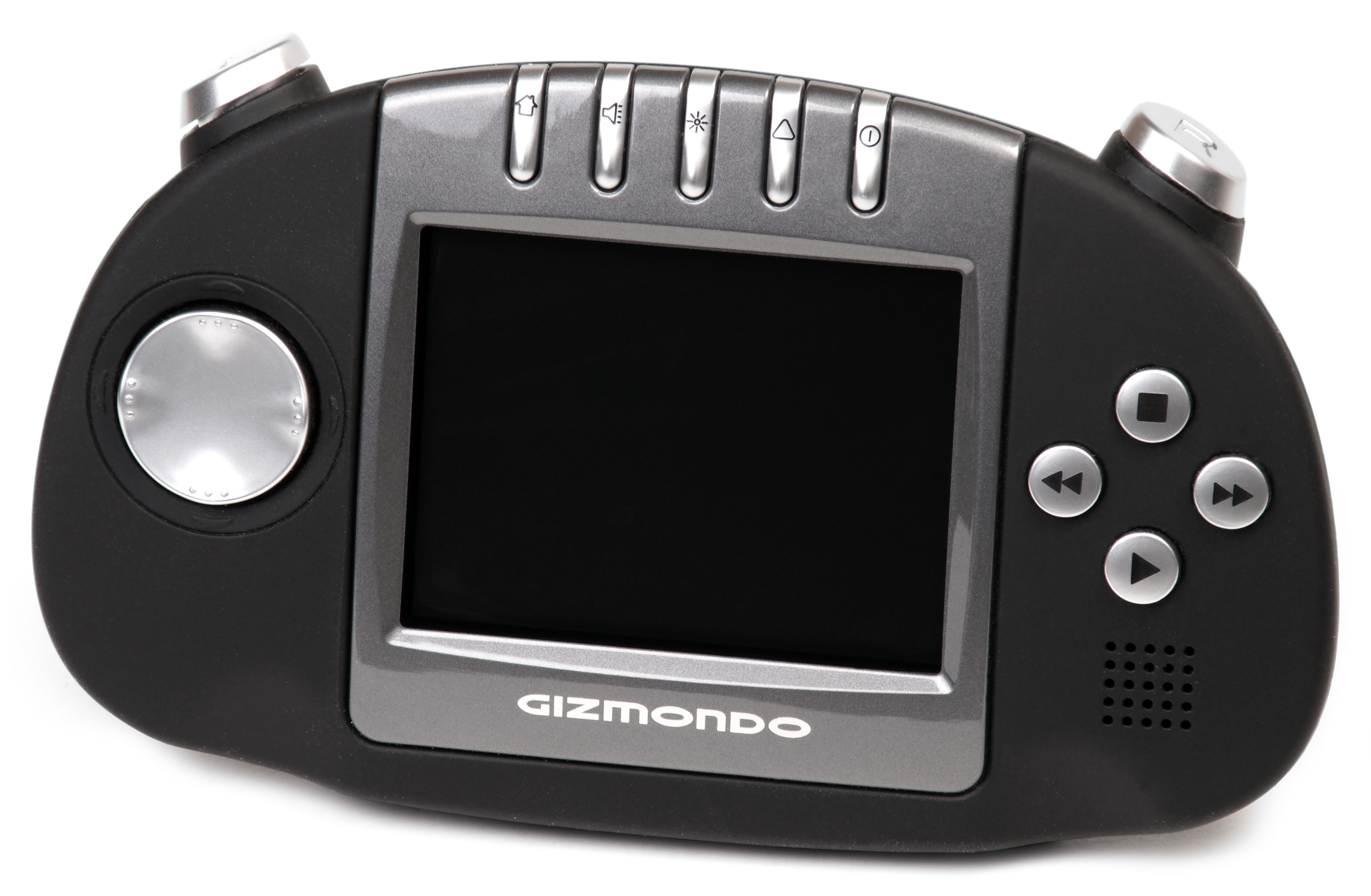
The Gizmondo

Tiger's Gizmondo came out in the UK during March 2005 and it was released in the U.S. during October 2005. It is designed to play music, movies, and games, has a camera for taking and storing photos, and has GPS functions. It also has Internet capabilities. It has a phone for sending text and multimedia messages. Email was promised at launch, but was never released before Gizmondo and ultimately Tiger Telematics' downfall in early 2006. Users obtained a second service pack, unreleased, hoping to find such functionality. However, Service Pack B did not activate the e-mail functionality.

==== GP2X Series ====
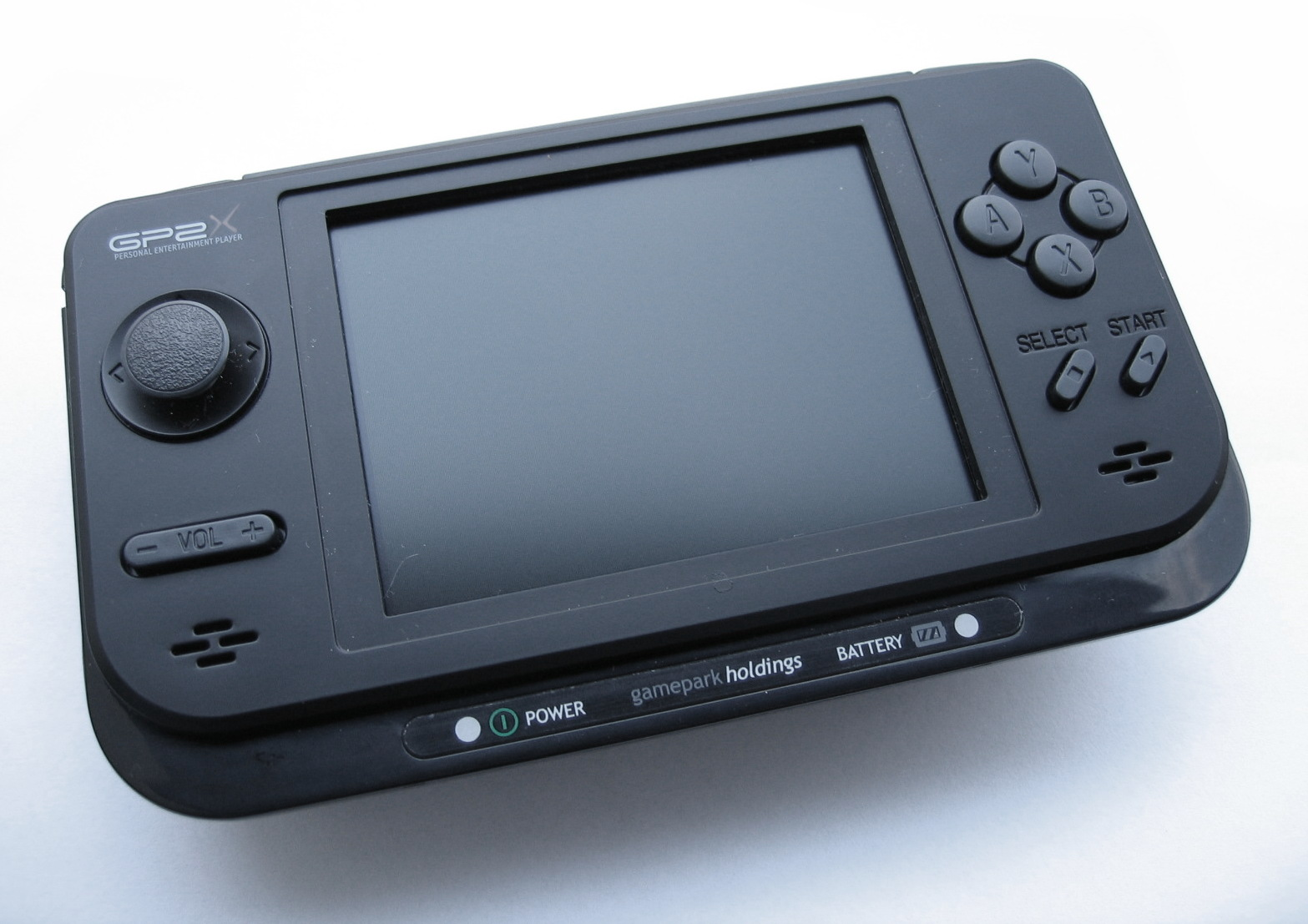
The Game Park Holdings GP2X F-100

The GP2X is an open-source, Linux-based handheld video game console and media player created by GamePark Holdings of South Korea, designed for homebrew developers as well as commercial developers. It is commonly used to run emulators for game consoles such as Neo-Geo, Genesis, Master System, Game Gear, Amstrad CPC, Commodore 64, Nintendo Entertainment System, TurboGrafx-16, MAME and others.

A new version called the "F200" was released on October 30, 2007, and features a touchscreen, among other changes. Followed by GP2X Wiz (2009) and GP2X Caanoo (2010).

=== Late 2000s ===
==== Dingoo ====
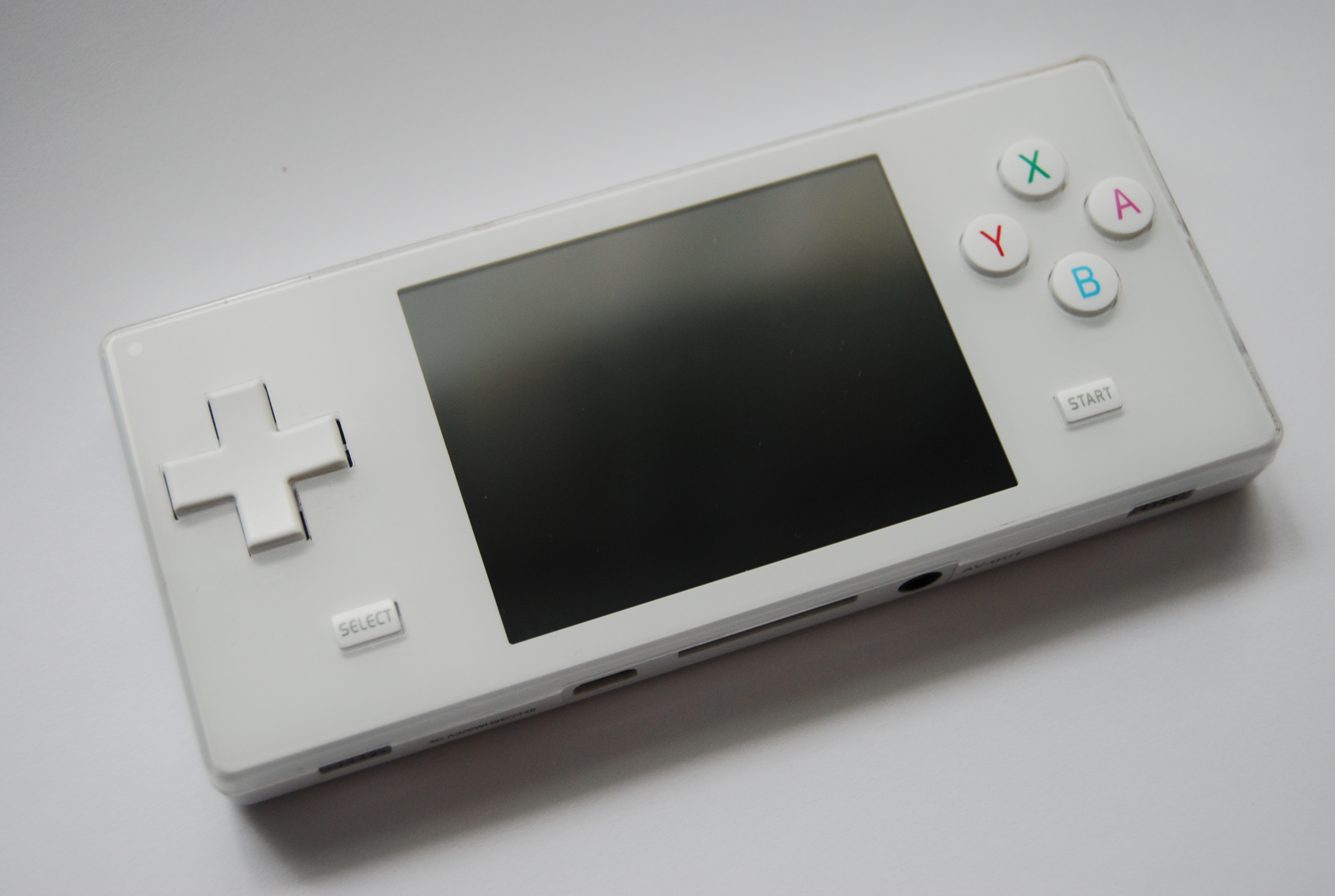
The Dingoo A320

The Dingoo A320 is a micro-sized gaming handheld that resembles the Game Boy Micro and is open to game development. It also supports music, radio, emulators (8 bit and 16 bit) and video playing capabilities with its own interface much like the PSP. There is also an onboard radio and recording program. It is currently available in two colors — white and black. Other similar products from the same manufacturer are the Dingoo A330 (also known as Geimi), Dingoo A360, Dingoo A380, and Dingoo A320E.

==== PSP Go ====
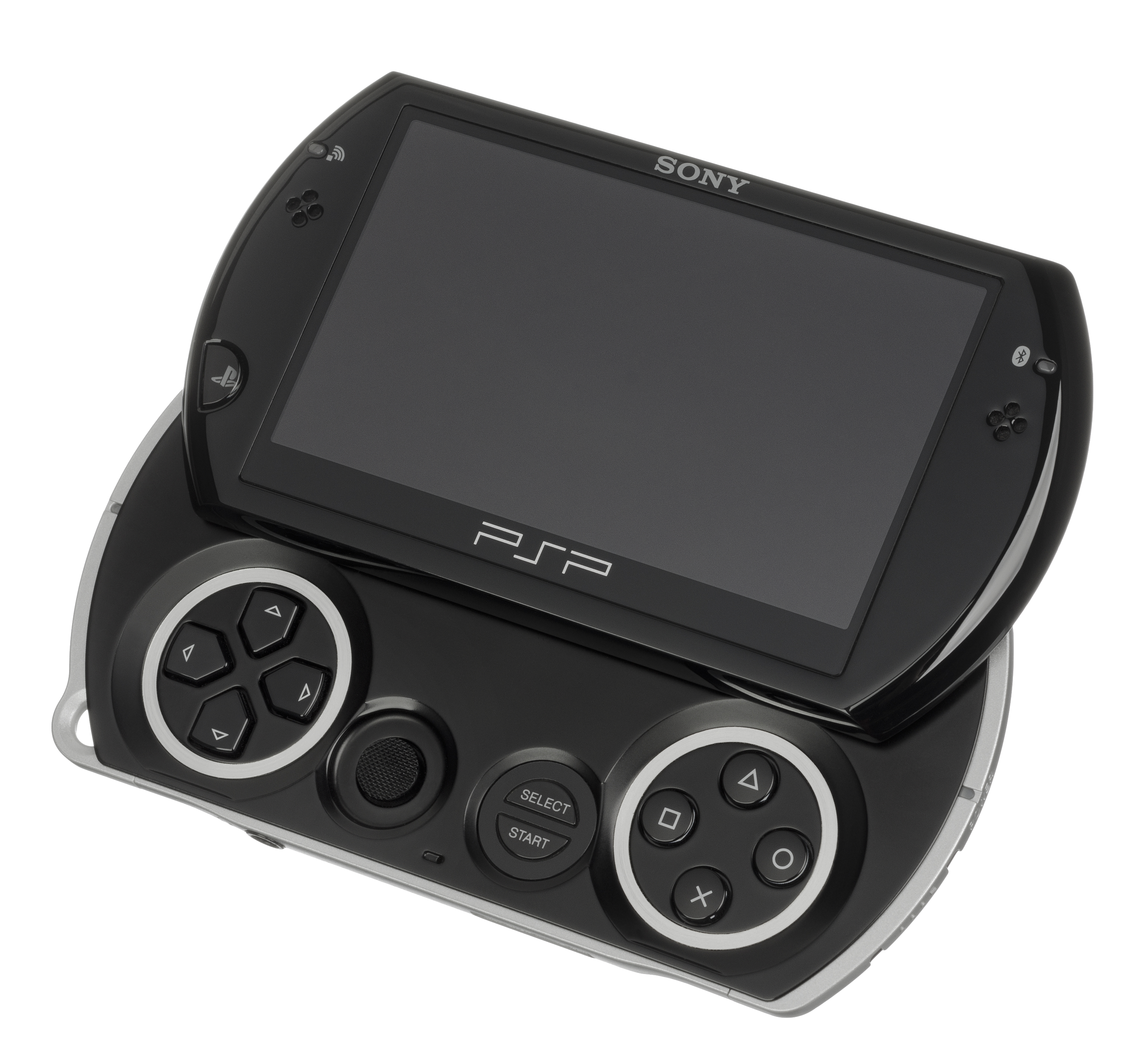
PSP Go

The PSP Go is a version of the PlayStation Portable handheld game console manufactured by Sony. It was released on October 1, 2009, in American and European territories, and on November 1 in Japan. It was revealed before E3 2009 through Sony's Qore VOD service. Although its design is significantly different from other PSPs, it is not intended to replace the PSP 3000, which Sony continued to manufacture, sell, and support. On April 20, 2011, the manufacturer announced that the PSP Go would be discontinued so that they may concentrate on the PlayStation Vita. Sony later said that only the European and Japanese versions were being cut, and that the console would still be available in the US. Unlike previous PSP models, the PSP Go does not feature a UMD drive, but instead has 16 GB of internal flash memory to store games, video, pictures, and other media. This can be extended by up to 32 GB with the use of a Memory Stick Micro (M2) flash card. Also unlike previous PSP models, the PSP Go's rechargeable battery is not removable or replaceable by the user. The unit is 43% lighter and 56% smaller than the original PSP-1000, and 16% lighter and 35% smaller than the PSP-3000. It has a 3.8" 480 × 272 LCD (compared to the larger 4.3" 480 × 272 pixel LCD on previous PSP models). The screen slides up to reveal the main controls. The overall shape and sliding mechanism are similar to that of Sony's mylo COM-2 internet device.

==== Pandora ====
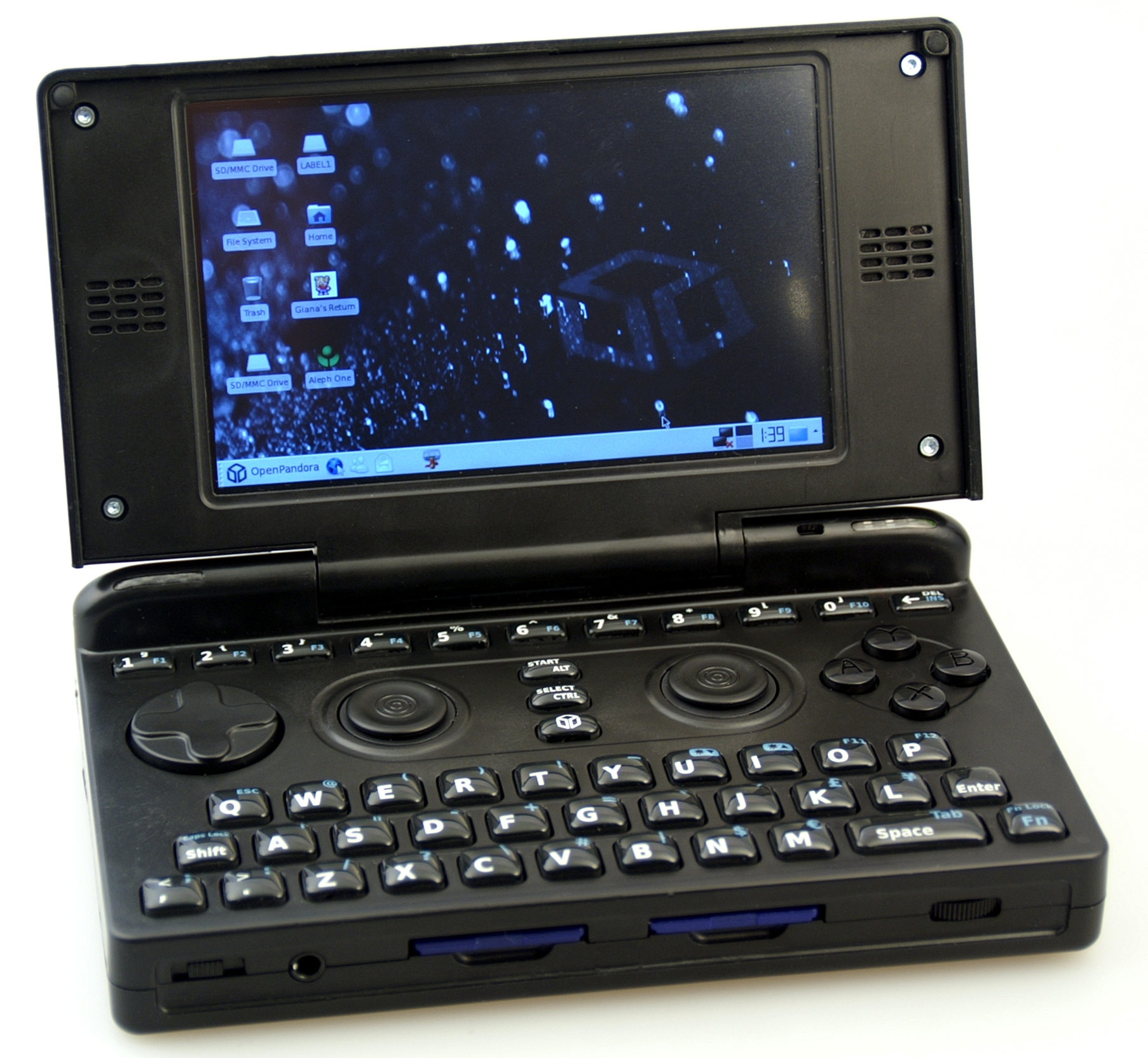
Pandora

The Pandora is a handheld game console/UMPC/PDA hybrid designed to take advantage of existing open source software and to be a target for home-brew development. It runs a full distribution of Linux, and in functionality is like a small PC with gaming controls. It is developed by OpenPandora, which is made up of former distributors and community members of the GP32 and GP2X handhelds.

OpenPandora began taking pre-orders for one batch of 4000 devices in November 2008 and after manufacturing delays, began shipping to customers on May 21, 2010.

==== FC-16 Go ====
The FC-16 Go is a portable Super NES hardware clone manufactured by Yobo Gameware in 2009. It features a 3.5-inch display, two wireless controllers, and CRT cables that allow cartridges to be played on a television screen. Unlike other Super NES clone consoles, it has region tabs that only allow NTSC North American cartridges to be played. Later revisions feature stereo sound output, larger shoulder buttons, and a slightly rearranged button, power, and A/V output layout.

=== 2010s ===
==== Nintendo 3DS ====
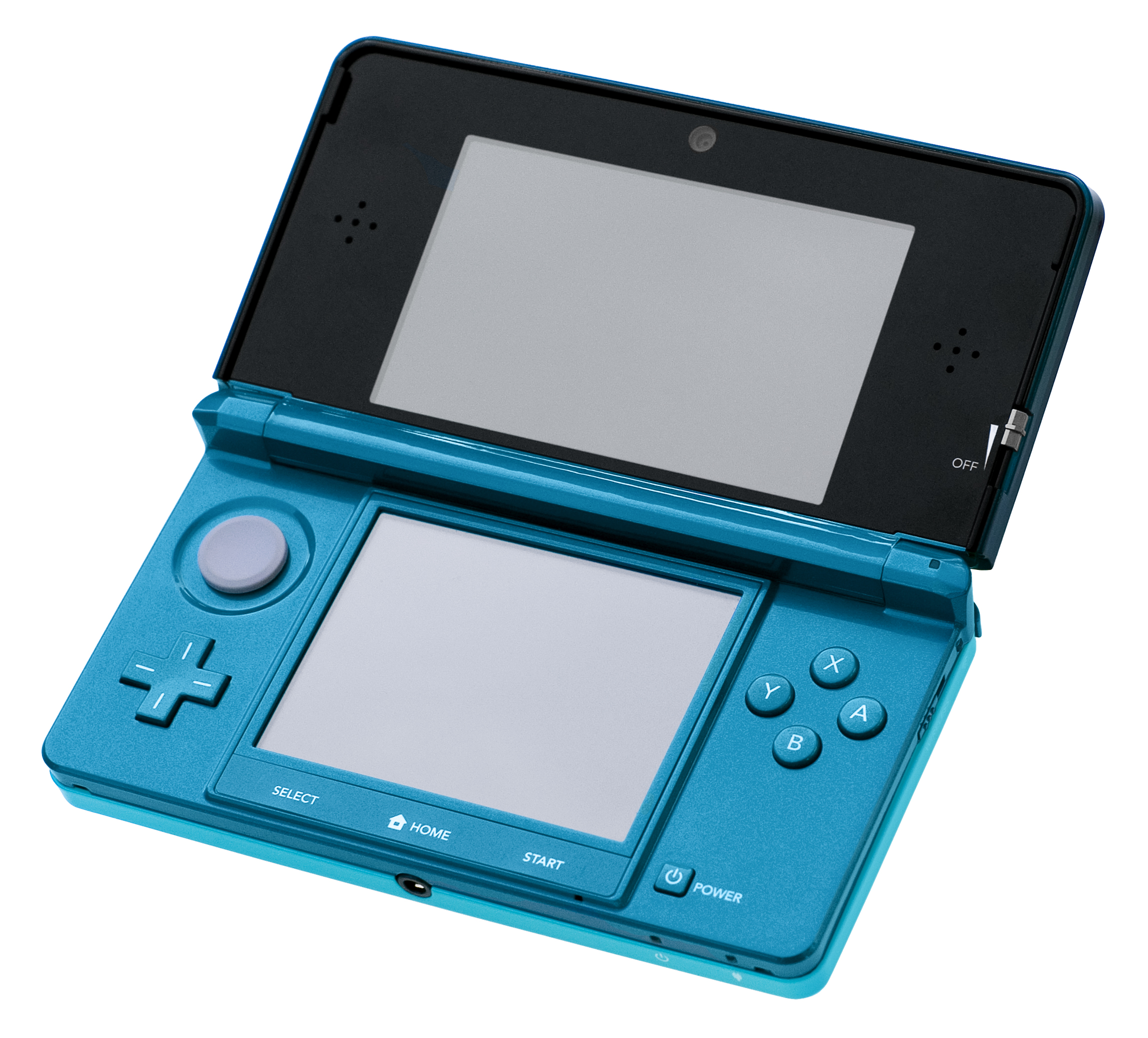
The original cyan Nintendo 3DS

The Nintendo 3DS is the successor to Nintendo's DS handheld. The autostereoscopic device is able to project stereoscopic three-dimensional effects without the requirement of active shutter or passive polarized glasses, which are required by most current 3D televisions to display the 3D effect. The 3DS was released in Japan on February 26, 2011; in Europe on March 25, 2011; in North America on March 27, 2011, and in Australia on March 31, 2011. The system features backward compatibility with Nintendo DS series software, including Nintendo DSi software except those that require the Game Boy Advance slot. It also features an online service called the Nintendo eShop, launched on June 6, 2011, in North America and June 7, 2011, in Europe and Japan, which allows owners to download games, demos, applications and information on upcoming film and game releases. On November 24, 2011, a limited edition Legend of Zelda 25th Anniversary 3DS was released that contained a unique Cosmo Black unit decorated with gold Legend of Zelda related imagery, along with a copy of The Legend of Zelda: Ocarina of Time 3D.

There are also other models including the Nintendo 2DS and the New Nintendo 3DS, the latter with a larger (XL/LL) variant, like the original Nintendo 3DS, as well as the New Nintendo 2DS XL.

==== Xperia Play ====
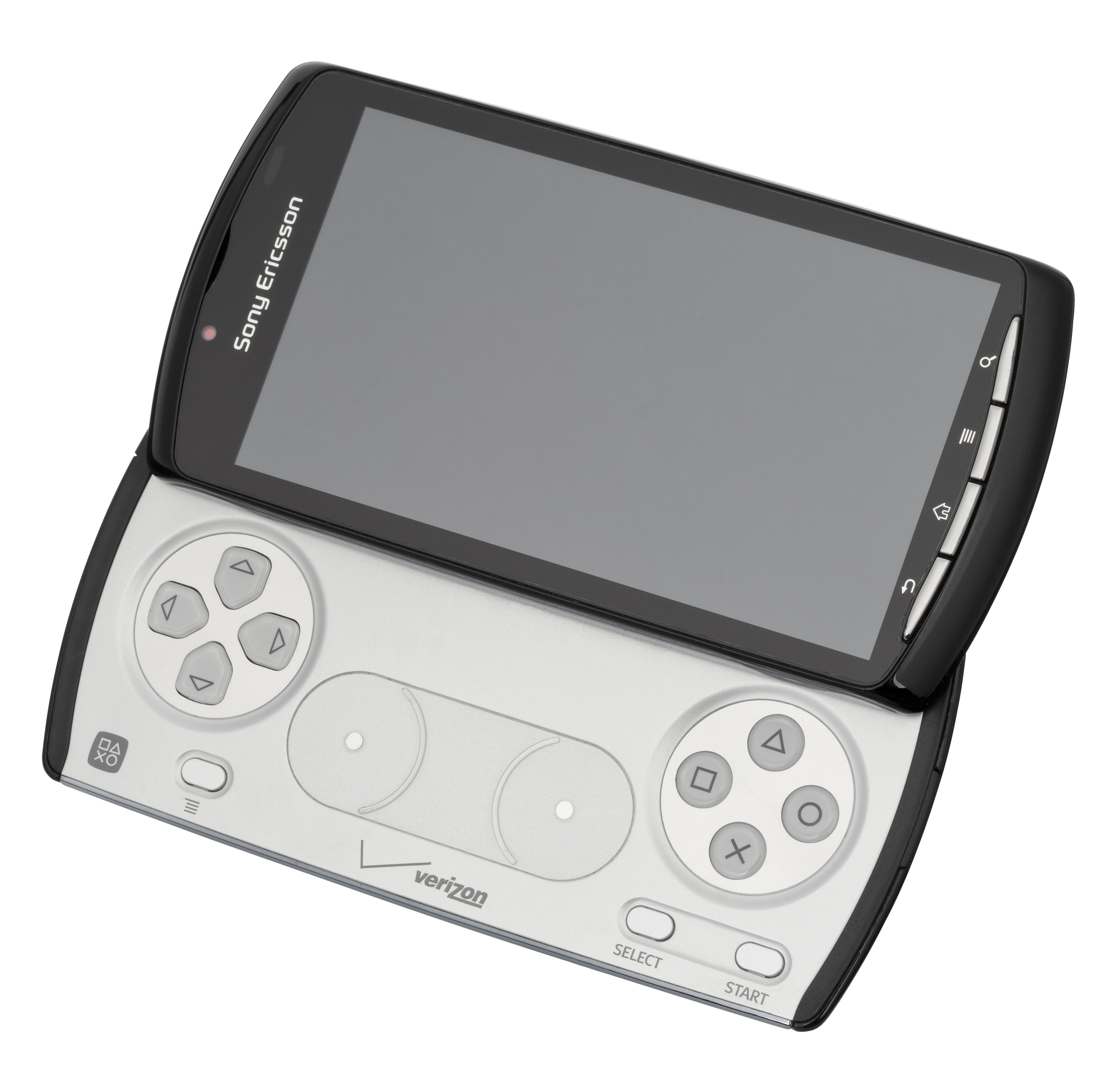
Xperia PLAY

The Sony Ericsson Xperia PLAY is a handheld game console smartphone produced by Sony Ericsson under the Xperia smartphone brand. The device runs Android 2.3 Gingerbread, and is the first to be part of the PlayStation Certified program which means that it can play PlayStation Suite games. The device is a horizontally sliding phone with its original form resembling the Xperia X10 while the slider below resembles the slider of the PSP Go. The slider features a D-pad on the left side, a set of standard PlayStation buttons ( and) on the right, a long rectangular touchpad in the middle, start and select buttons on the bottom right corner, a menu button on the bottom left corner, and two shoulder buttons (L and R) on the back of the device. It is powered by a 1 GHz Qualcomm Snapdragon processor, a Qualcomm Adreno 205 GPU, and features a display measuring 4.0 inches (100 mm) (854 × 480), an 8-megapixel camera, 512 MB RAM, 8 GB internal storage, and a micro-USB connector. It supports microSD cards, versus the Memory Stick variants used in PSP consoles. The device was revealed officially for the first time in a Super Bowl ad on Sunday, February 6, 2011. On February 13, 2011, at Mobile World Congress (MWC) 2011, it was announced that the device would be shipping globally in March 2011, with a launch lineup of around 50 software titles.

==== PlayStation Vita ====
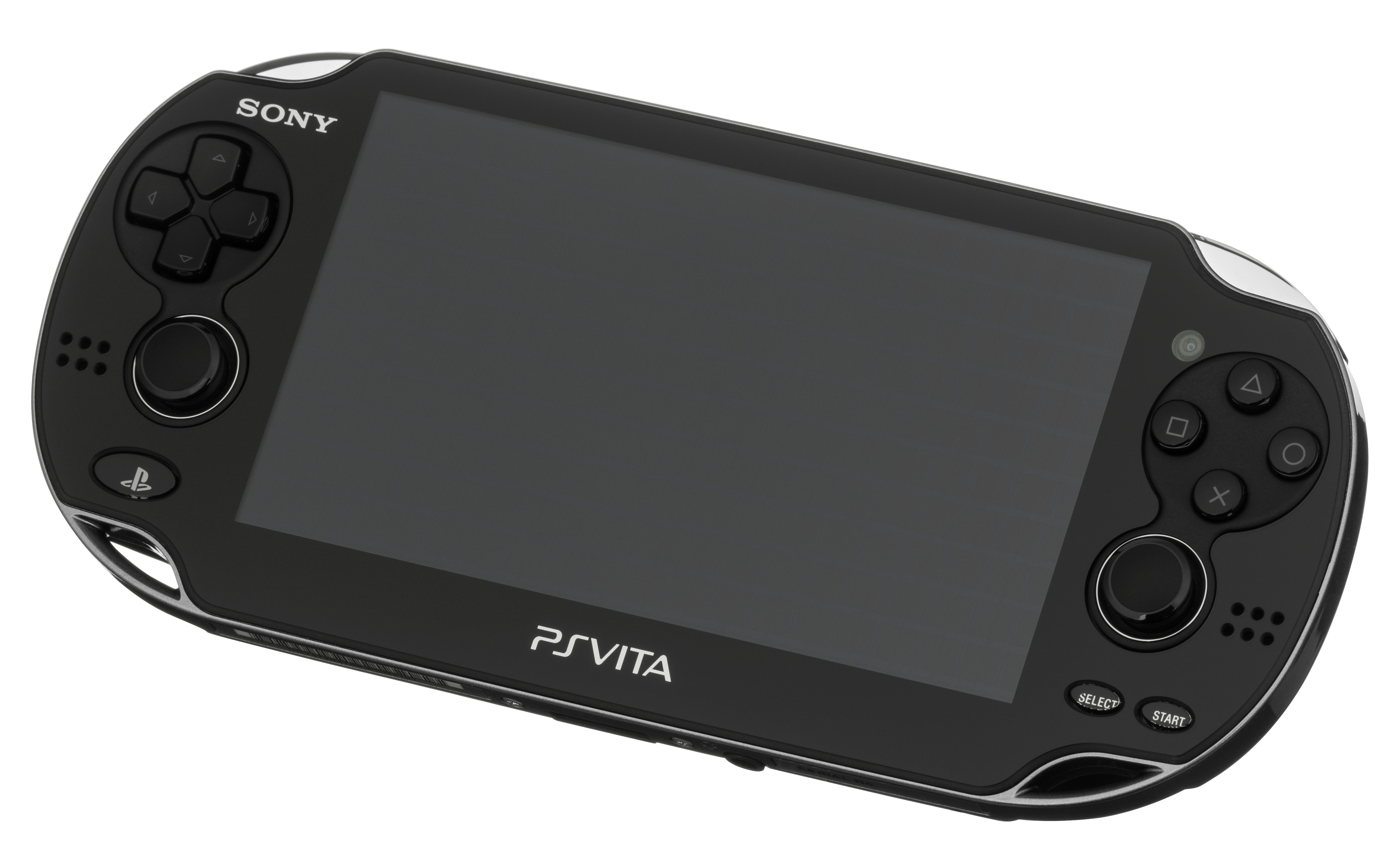
PlayStation Vita

The PlayStation Vita is the successor to Sony's PlayStation Portable (PSP) Handheld series. It was released in Japan on December 17, 2011, and in Europe, Australia, North America, and South America on February 22, 2012.

The handheld includes two analog sticks, a 5-inch (130 mm) OLED/LCD multi-touch capacitive touchscreen, and supports Bluetooth, Wi-Fi and optional 3G. Internally, the PS Vita features a 4-core ARM Cortex-A9 MPCore processor and a 4-core SGX543MP4+ graphics processing unit, as well as LiveArea software as its main user interface, which succeeds the XrossMediaBar.

The device is fully backwards-compatible with PlayStation Portable games digitally released on the PlayStation Network via the PlayStation Store. However, PSone Classics and PS2 titles were not compatible at the time of the primary public release in Japan. The Vita's dual analog sticks will be supported on selected PSP games. The graphics for PSP releases will be up-scaled, with a smoothing filter to reduce pixelation.

On September 20, 2018, Sony announced at Tokyo Game Show 2018 that the Vita would be discontinued in 2019, ending its hardware production. Production of Vita hardware officially ended on March 1, 2019.

==== Nvidia Shield ====
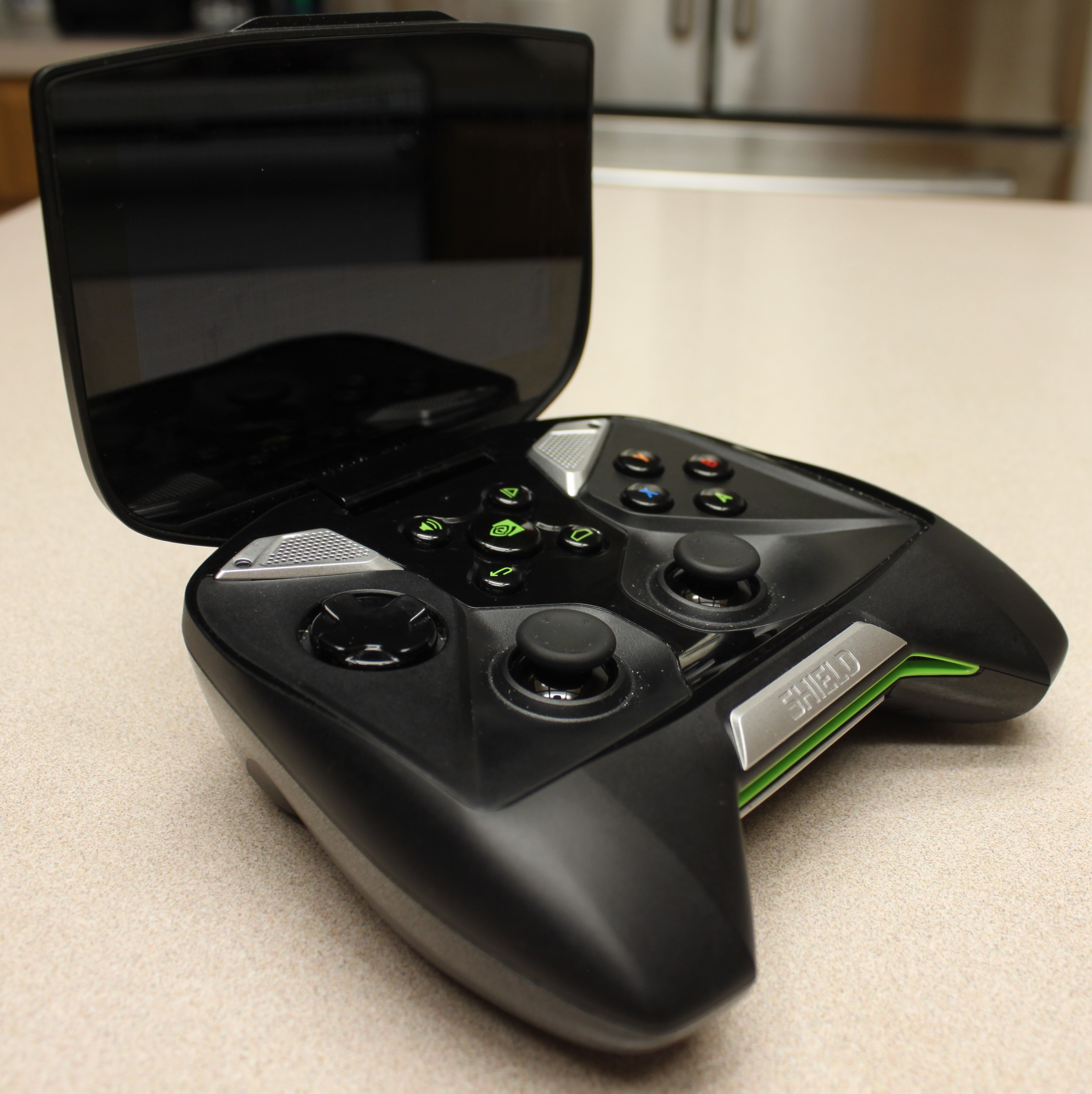
Nvidia Shield Portable

Project Shield is a handheld system developed by Nvidia and announced at CES 2013. It runs on Android 4.2 and uses Nvidia Tegra 4 SoC. The hardware includes a 5-inch multitouch screen with support for HD graphics (720p). The console allows for the streaming of games running on a compatible desktop PC or laptop.

Nvidia Shield Portable has received mixed reception from critics. Generally, reviewers praised the performance of the device, but criticized the cost and lack of worthwhile games. Engadget's review noted the system's "extremely impressive PC gaming", but also that due to its high price, the device was "a hard sell as a portable game console", especially when compared to similar handhelds on the market. CNET's Eric Franklin states in his review of the device that "The Nvidia Shield is an extremely well made device, with performance that pretty much obliterates any mobile product before it; but like most new console launches, there is currently a lack of available games worth your time." Eurogamer's comprehensive review of the device provides a detailed account of the device and its features; concluded by saying: "In the here and now, the first-gen Shield Portable is a gloriously niche, luxury product - the most powerful Android system on the market by a clear stretch and possessing a unique link to PC gaming that's seriously impressive in beta form, and can only get better."

==== Nintendo Switch ====
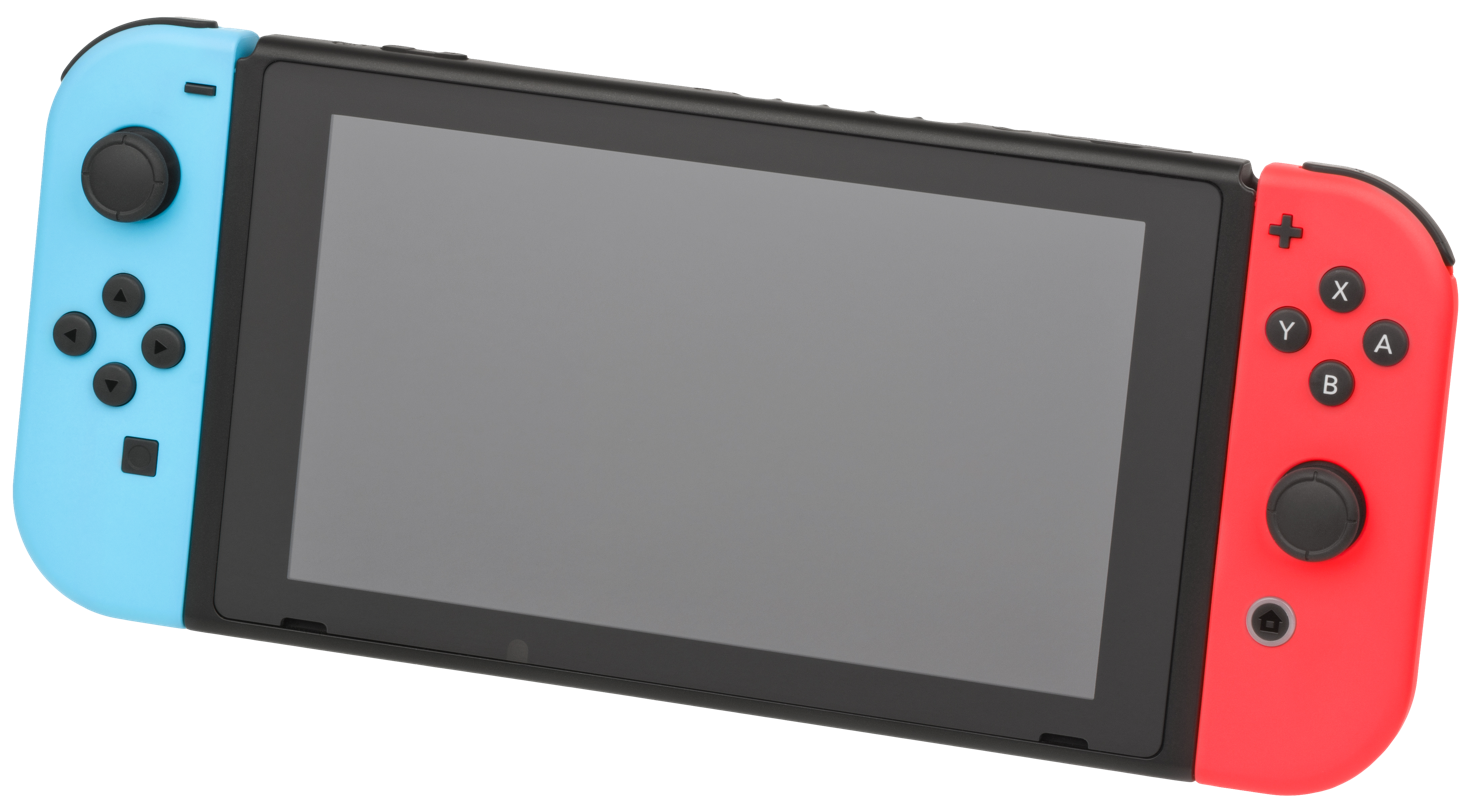
The Nintendo Switch in portable mode

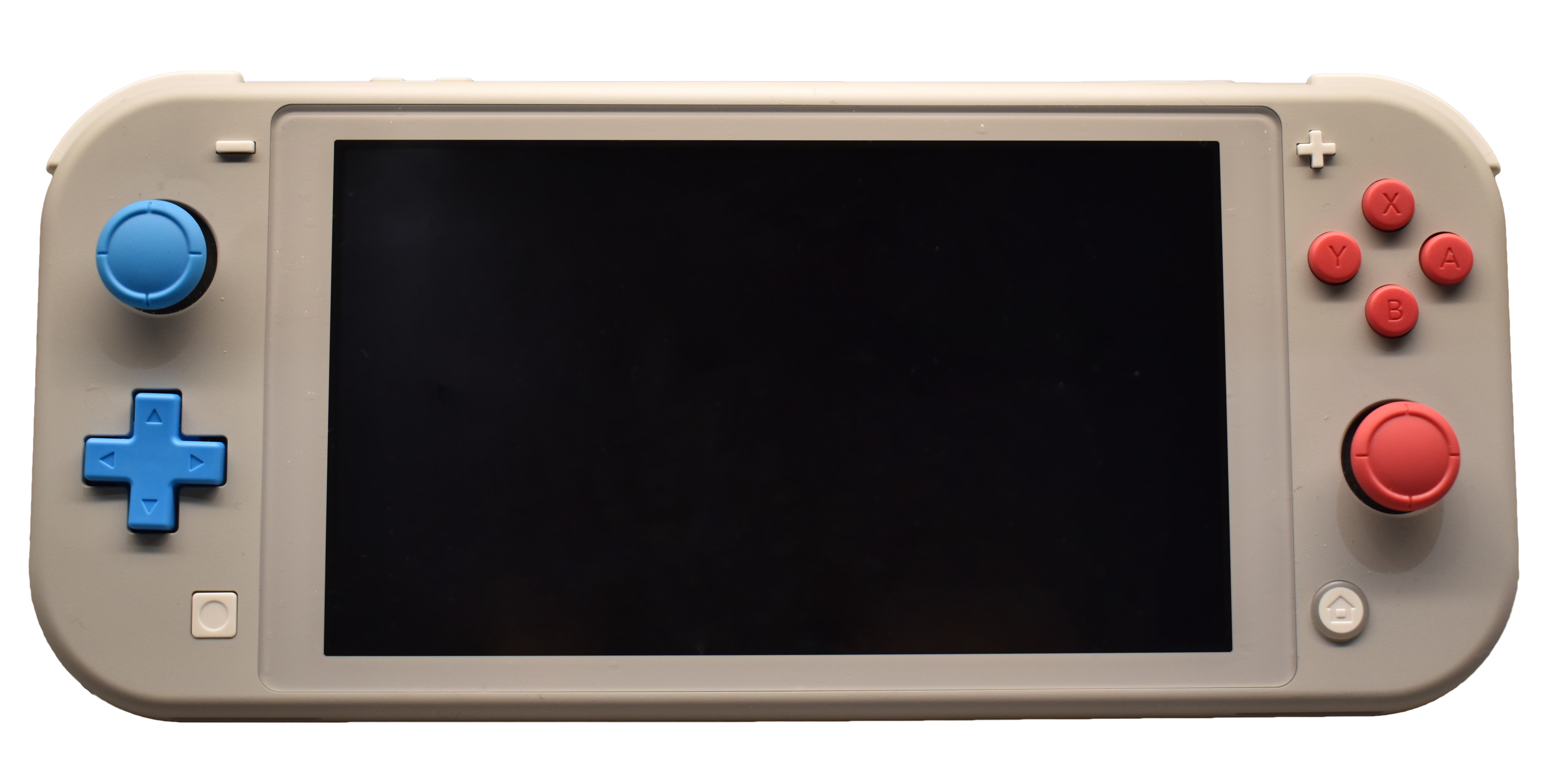
The Nintendo Switch Lite, a revision that only has handheld mode

The Nintendo Switch is a hybrid console that can either be used in a handheld form, or inserted into a docking station attached to a television to play on a bigger screen. The Switch features two detachable wireless controllers, called Joy-Con, which can be used individually or attached to a grip to provide a traditional gamepad form. A handheld-only revision named Nintendo Switch Lite was released on September 20, 2019.

The Switch Lite had sold about 1.95 million units worldwide by September 30, 2019, only 10 days after its launch.

=== 2020s ===
==== Evercade ====
Evercade is a handheld game console developed and manufactured by UK company Blaze Entertainment. It focuses on retrogaming with ROM cartridges that each contain a number of emulated games. Development began in 2018, and the console was released in May 2020, after a few delays. Upon its launch, the console offered 10 game cartridges with a combined total of 122 games.

Arc System Works, Atari, Data East, Interplay Entertainment, Bandai Namco Entertainment and Piko Interactive have released emulated versions of their games for the Evercade. Pre-existing homebrew games have also been re-released for the console by Mega Cat Studios. The Evercade is capable of playing games released for the Atari 2600, the Atari 7800, the Atari Lynx, the NES, the Super NES, and the Genesis/Mega Drive.

==== Analogue Pocket ====
The Analogue Pocket is a FPGA-based handheld game console designed and manufactured by Analogue, It is designed to play games designed for handhelds of the fourth, fifth and sixth generation of video game consoles. The console features a design reminiscent of the Game Boy, with additional buttons for the supported platforms. It features a 3.5" 1600x1440 LTPS LCD screen, an SD card port, and a link cable port compatible with Game Boy link cables. The Analogue Pocket uses an Altera Cyclone V processor and is compatible with the original Game Boy, Game Boy Color and Game Boy Advance cartridges out of the box. With cartridge adapters (sold separately) the Analogue Pocket can play Game Gear, Neo Geo Pocket, Neo Geo Pocket Color and Atari Lynx game cartridges. The Analogue Pocket includes an additional FPGA, allowing 3rd party FPGA development. The Analogue Pocket was released in December 2021.

==== Steam Deck ====
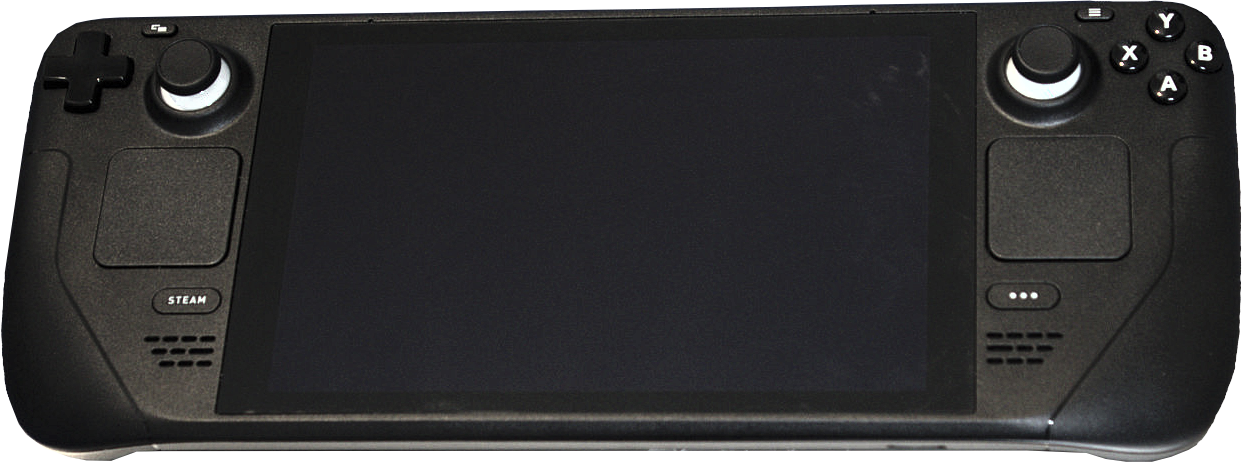
Steam Deck

The Steam Deck is a handheld computer device, developed by Valve, which runs SteamOS, a tailored distribution of Arch Linux and includes support for Proton, a compatibility layer that allows most Microsoft Windows games to be played on the Linux-based operating system. This device and other similar ones generally are not referred to as "consoles" but more commonly as handheld gaming computers, since they run on standard PC hardware and software (including the ability to access a desktop environment) and are not restricted to only running software provided by the vendor.

In terms of hardware, the Deck includes a custom AMD APU based on their Zen 2 and RDNA 2 architectures, with the CPU running a four-core/eight-thread unit and the GPU running on eight compute units with a total estimated performance of 1.6 TFLOPS. Both the CPU and GPU use variable timing frequencies, with the CPU running between 2.4 and 3.5 GHz and the GPU between 1.0 and 1.6 GHz based on current processor needs. Valve stated that the CPU has comparable performance to Ryzen 3000 desktop computer processors and the GPU performance to the Radeon RX 6000 series. The Deck includes 16 GB of LPDDR5 RAM in a quad channel configuration.

Valve revealed the Steam Deck on July 15, 2021, with pre-orders being made available the next day. The Deck was expected to ship in December 2021 to the US, Canada, the EU and the UK but was delayed to February 2022, with other regions to follow in 2022. Pre-orders were limited to those with Steam accounts opened before June 2021 to prevent resellers from controlling access to the device. Pre-order reservations on July 16, 2021 briefly crashed the Steam storefront servers due to the demand. While initial shipments are still planned by February 2022, Valve has reported to new purchasers that wider availability will be later, with the 64 GB model and 256 GB NVMe model due in Q2 2022, and the 512 GB NVMe model by Q3 2022. Steam Deck was released on February 25, 2022.

==== Nintendo Switch 2 ====
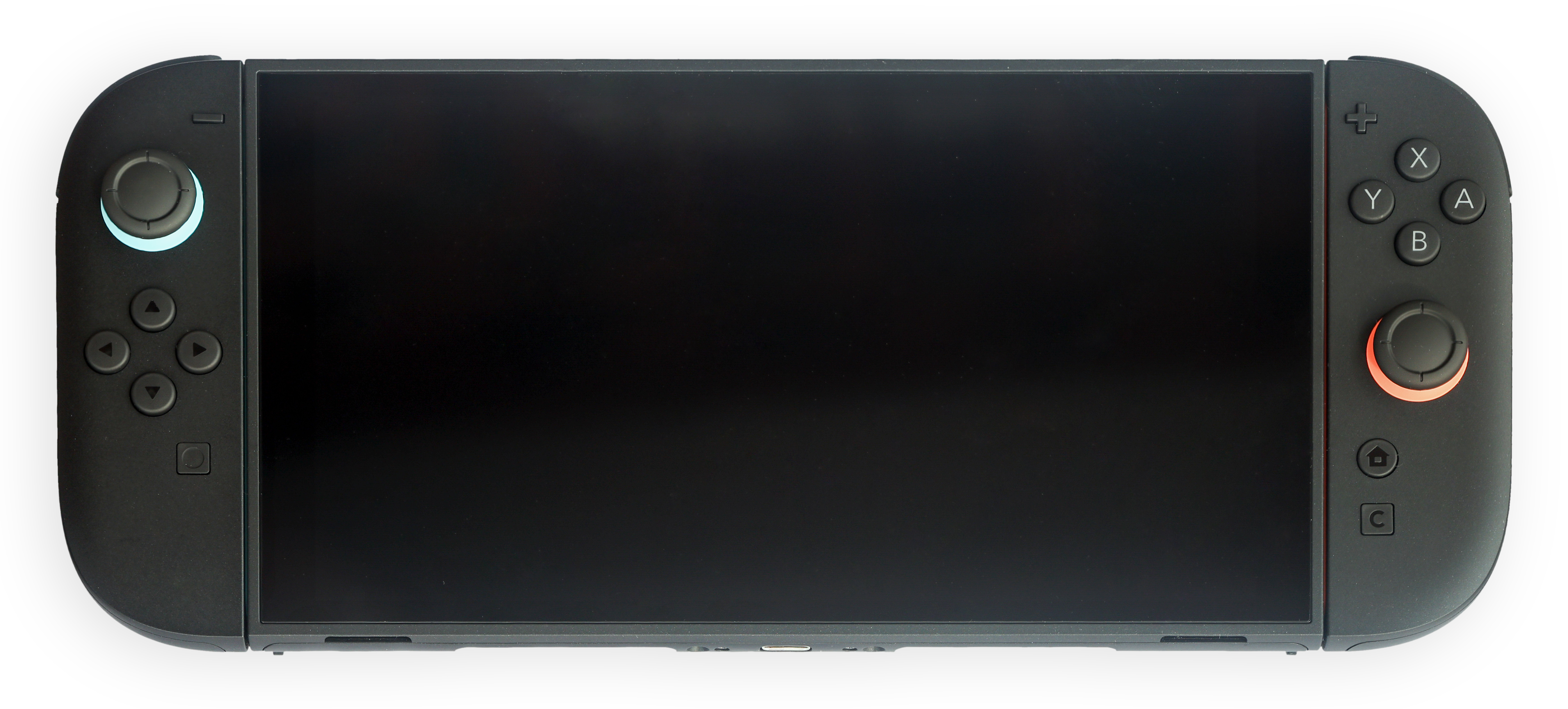
The Nintendo Switch 2 in portable mode

The Nintendo Switch 2 is the direct successor of the Nintendo Switch, which was released on June 5, 2025. Like its predecessor, Switch 2 is a hybrid console: It can either be used in a handheld form, or inserted into a docking station attached to a television to play on a bigger screen.

==== ROG Xbox Ally ====
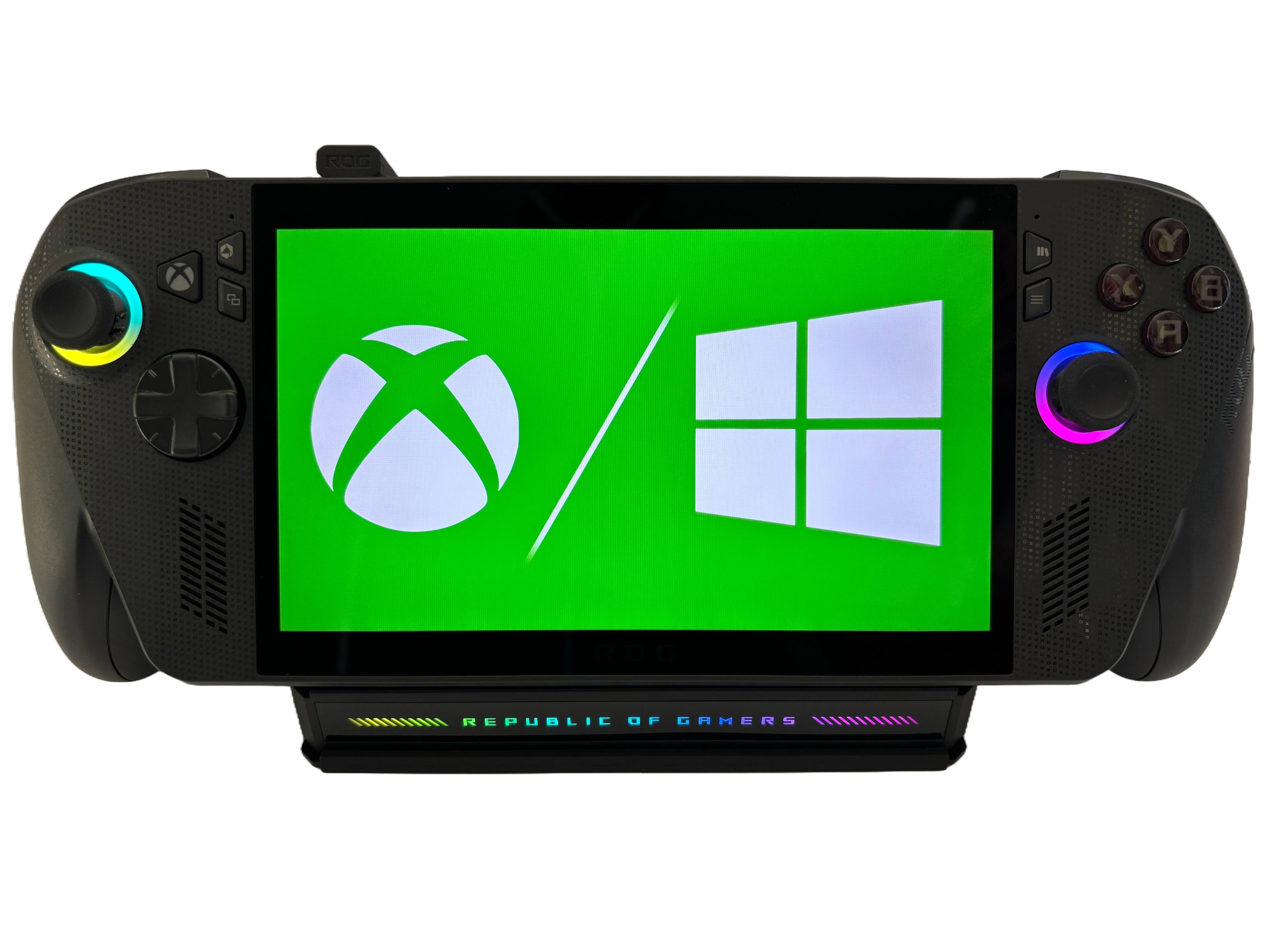
ROG Xbox Ally X

The ROG Xbox Ally is a handheld gaming computer and handheld game console co-developed by Asus and Microsoft, and manufactured by Asus as part of the Republic of Gamers (ROG) and Xbox brands. A successor to the Asus ROG Ally, it was released on October 16, 2025.

== See also ==
- List of handheld game consoles
- Video game console emulator
- Handheld electronic game
- Handheld television
- Video games and Linux
- Cloud gaming
- Mobile game
