= JXD S5100 =

Android-based handheld game console

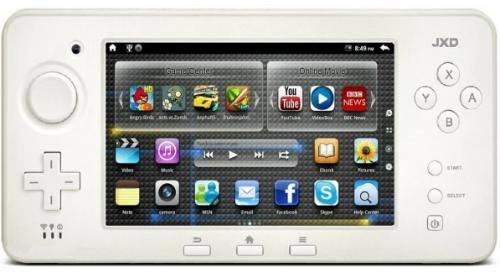
- Developer: JXD
- Manufacturer: JXD
- Type: Handheld game console Tablet computer
- Released: 2012
- Introductory price: ≈$110 USD
- Operating system: Android 4.0 (Ice Cream Sandwich)
- CPU: Amlogic 8726 M3, ARM Cortex-A9 CPU; ARM Mali-400 MP GPU
- Memory: 512MB DDR3 SDRAM
- Display: 5-inch, 800x480 five-point capacitive touchscreen
- Input: Touchscreen; Analog nub; D-pad; Digital buttons; Accelerometer; Gyroscope
- Controller input: D-pad; Circle pad A, B, X, Y buttons Volume buttons Start and Select buttons Home, Back, and Menu buttons Power button
- Camera: 0.3M Front Camera, 0.2M Back Camera
- Touchpad: Touchscreen
- Connectivity: WiFi headphone jack Mini HDMI output Mini USB; MicroSD card slot
- Online services: Google Play
- Dimensions: 7.37 in (187 mm) L 3.14 in (80 mm) W 0.60 in (15 mm) D
- Weight: 0.51 lb (0.23 kg)
- Predecessor: JXD S5110
- Successor: JXD S603
- Related: JXD; JXD 1000
- Website: Official Website

The JXD S5100 was a 5-inch Android tablet and portable game console produced by JXD. It was released in 2012 and resembles Nintendo's Wii U GamePad. Unlike the previous Sony-style JXD models, the S5100 lacks shoulder buttons.

== Features ==
In addition to its 5-inch, five-point capacitive touchscreen, the S5100 features four face buttons, a start and a select button, home, back and menu buttons, an accelerometer, a 0.3 megapixel front camera, and a 0.2-megapixel back camera that can be used to capture photos. On the bottom of the unit is an MicroSD card slot. On the top is a 5-volt AC jack, a Mini USB port, a Mini HDMI port, and a headphone jack.

It ships with 4 GB internal storage space and supports up to 32 GB expandable storage via-the MicroSD card slot on the bottom.

== Revisions ==
About a month or two after the S5100 was released, JXD released the S603, a 4.3-inch version of the S5100 that runs Android 2.3 Gingerbread with a GP33003 CPU and 512 MB RAM DDR3. In fall 2012, JXD also announced the S5600, which was to be an S5100 with Android 4.1 Jelly Bean, a five-point capacitive touchscreen, two analog circle pads, four shoulder buttons, a dual-core processor, and 1 GB DDR3 SDRAM. It was planned to be released alongside the popular S7300 model, but it was later replaced by the S5110b, which instead uses the earlier S5110's shell.

== See also ==
- JXD
- Android (operating system)
- Dingoo A320
- Retroid Pocket 2
- Nintendo 3DS
- Xperia Play
