= Game Gadget =

Open source handheld game console

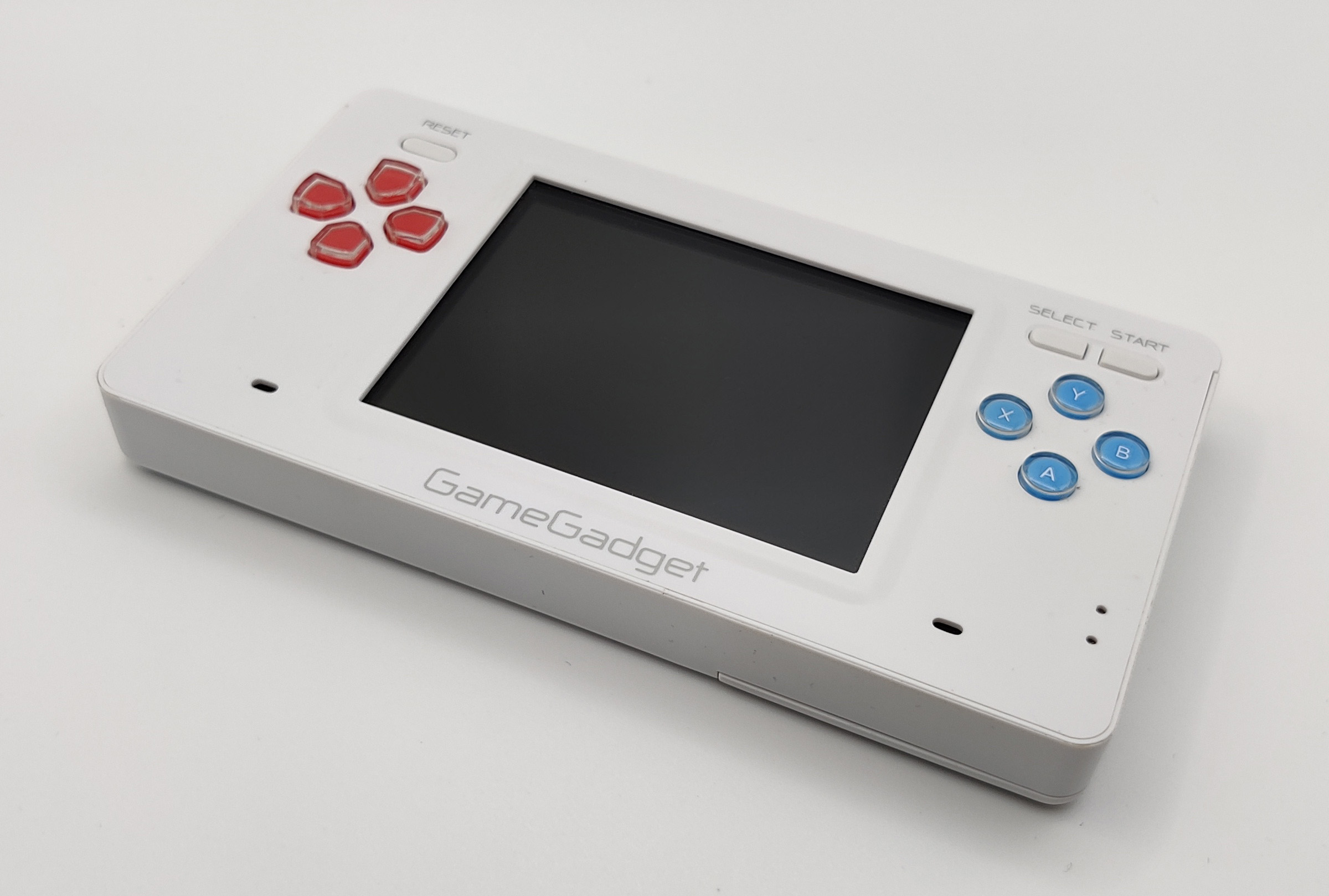
- Also known as: GameGadget
- Manufacturer: Blaze Europe
- Type: Handheld game console
- Released: April 5, 2012
- Introductory price: £59.99
- Units sold: 20,000
- Media: Digital distribution
- Operating system: Linux based
- CPU: MIPS Ingenic JZ4750 @ 433 MHz
- Memory: 64 MB
- Storage: 2GB Flash storage
- Removable storage: SDHC cards
- Display: 320x240 3.5" LCD
- Connectivity: micro USB port, TV out
- Current firmware: 1.01
- Online services: Online store
- Dimensions: 140 by 75 by 16 millimetres (5.51 in × 2.95 in × 0.63 in)
- Marketing target: Retrogamers
- Successor: Evercade
- Website: GameGadget.net (Archived)
- Language: C, C++. Python 2.7, Lua, Ruby

The Game Gadget is an open source gaming handheld that supports music and video playback, open game development, and some e-reader features.

== History ==
=== Development ===
Initial development of the system occurred in the United Kingdom, and open source software was used to lower development costs. Production occurred outside the United Kingdom.

The system had an initial release date of March 30, 2012.

=== Release ===
It was released on April 5, 2012, The initial launch price of the system was to be £99.99 British pounds, though this price quickly dropped to a cost of £59.99 British pounds with those who paid the earlier price receiving a refund for £40. On launch the system's online activation system was incomplete, leading to issues. Following release, the system was transferred from Blaze to Xploder.

By October 2012 20,000 Game Gadget units were sold worldwide.

A Game Gadget 1.1, Game Gadget Pocket and Game Gadget 2.0 was planned.

The Game Gadget was eventually succeeded by the better received Evercade.

== Specifications ==
=== Hardware ===
The Game Gadget made use of a dual core MIPS32 architecture Ingenic JZ4750 CPU, which was clocked at 433 MHz. The system sported 64 megabytes of RAM. Storage consisted of 2 GB of internal flash, and a SD/SDHC for removable storage. There is no 3D acceleration hardware. The primary display was a 3.5" LCD with a 320x240 resolution and 16-bit color, though the system also supported TV-out. Additional outputs included stereo speakers, a headphone jack, and a micro USB port. Inputs included a D-Pad, 2 shoulder buttons, 4 face buttons, Start & Select buttons. A lithium-ion battery powered the system for approximately 8 hours.

The system was relatively portable, though not particularly ergonomic, measuring 140 by 75 by 16 millimetres (5.51 in × 2.95 in × 0.63 in) and weighed about 160 grams (5.6 oz). It was only available in one colour, white.

=== Software ===
The Game Gadget ran an operating system based on Linux. A free official SDK was available. Officially supported development technologies included SDL, C, C++, Python 2.7, Ruby, and Lua.

Officially licensed Sega Mega Drive games were run with a version of the PicoDrive emulator. The system could run DRM protected software in a locked down mode, or community software in a "Sandbox" mode. An online store was used for digital distribution.

The system supported stereo playback of a number of audio codecs including MP3, WMA, APE, FLAC, WAV, AC3, MOD, S3M, XM and RealAudio. The system included a voice and radio recording application that supported MP3 and WAV formats. The system included a photo viewer that supports JPG, BMP, GIF, PNG file formats. An included text reader application supported TXT file formats in English and Chinese, as well as English text to speech. Further functions of the text reader include bookmarking, auto browsing, font sizing, and it can open while music is playing.

Two official firmware versions, V1.00 and v1.01, were released.

== See also ==
- Comparison of handheld game consoles
- Similar portable Linux-based gaming devices:
  - GCW Zero
  - GP32
  - GP2X
  - GP2X Wiz
  - GP2X Caanoo
  - Pandora (console)
- Mi2 console
