= Dingoo =

Handheld game console

Dingoo A320 and A330

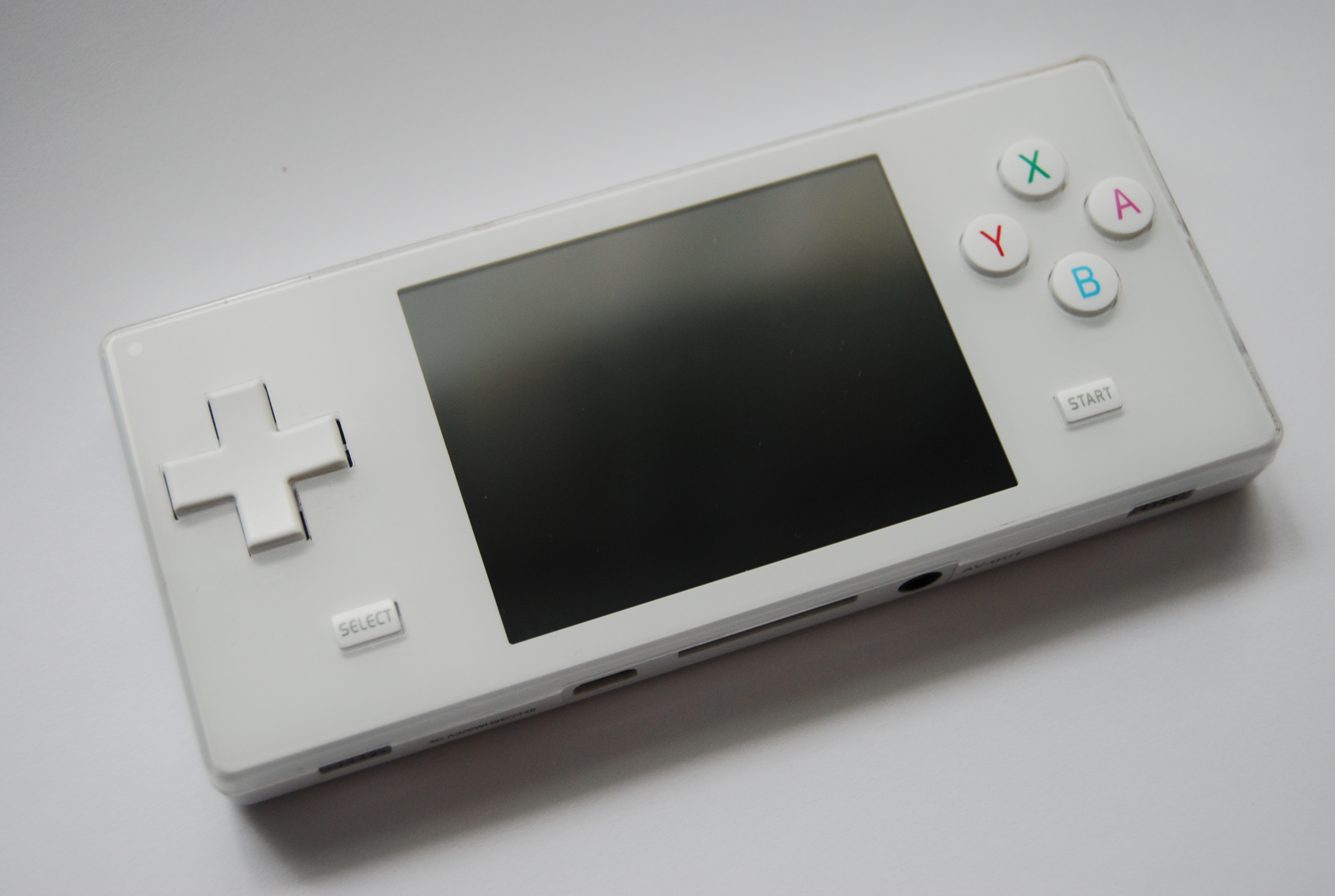
- Manufacturer: Dingoo Digital Technology
- Type: Handheld game console
- Generation: Seventh
- Lifespan: CN: February 2009
- Media: SD card
- Operating system: μC/OS-II; Micro-Controller Operating Systems
- System on a chip: Jz4732 / Jz4740
- CPU: 360MHz XBurst (MIPS)
- Memory: 32MB RAM (Dingoo A320) / 64MB RAM (Dingoo A330)
- Storage: SanDisk 2GB Mini SD internal flash memory
- Display: 2.8" LCD, 320×240px, 65.5K colors
- Dimensions: 125 × 55.5 × 14mm
- Weight: 110g
- Website: dingoo.hk at the Wayback Machine (archived February 10, 2012)

The Dingoo (Chinese: 丁果) is a handheld gaming console that supports music and video playback and open game development. The system features an on-board radio and recording program. It was sold to consumers in three colors: white, black, and pink. It was released in February 2009 and had sold over 1 million units.

Other versions of the console include Dingoo A330 and Dingoo A380.

Dingoo focused on games and media products, and was located in the Futian District, Shenzhen.

== Hardware ==
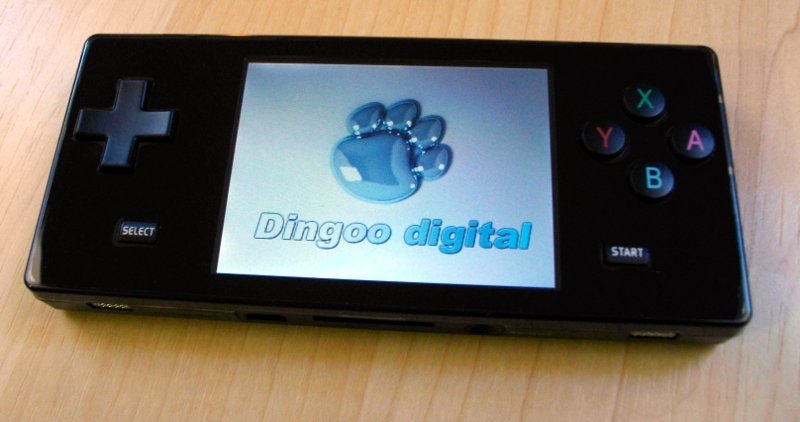
A black Dingoo.

=== Specifications ===
==== A320 ====
- Internal Storage 1/2/4GB flash
- Additional Storage MiniSD/SDHC (MicroSD/SDHC with adapter)
- Input D-Pad, 2 shoulder, 4 face, Start & Select buttons, Microphone.
- Outputs Stereo Speakers, Headphone Jack & TV-out w/ included cable
- I/O Mini-USB connector 2.0
- Video Playback RM, MP4, 3GP, AVI, ASF, MOV, FLV, MPEG
- Audio Playback MP3, WMA, APE, FLAC, RA
- Radio Digital FM Tuner
- Recording Supports digital recording of voice (MP3 and WMA formats) and FM radio at 8 kHz
- Software Support Free official SDKs Available
- Dimensions 125 by 55.5 by 14 millimetres (4.92 in × 2.19 in × 0.55 in)
- Weight 110 g (3.9 oz)
- Display 320×240

The Dingoo A320 uses a rechargeable Lithium-ion battery with 6 to 8 hours of battery life. The battery specs are 3.7V 1700-1800 mAh (6.29WH).

== Function ==
=== Games ===
==== Original ====
Original games in two different languages (USA (U) and Chinese (C)) for the Native OS are included:

- 7 Days - Salvation (U)
- Ali Baba (U)
- Amiba's Candy (U)
- Block Breaker (U)
- Decollation Warrior [God of War Criminal Day] (U)
- Dingoo Link Em Up (U)
- Dingoo Snake (U)
- Hell Striker II [World Road] (U)
- Landlord (U)
- Nose Breaker (U)
- Puzzle Bobble [PoPo Bash] (C)
- Tetris (U)
- Ultimate Drift (U)
- Yi-Chi King Fighter (C)
- Zhao Yun Chuan (C)

==== Homebrew ====
Homebrew / Public Domain (PD) games for all operation systems (OS) can be added manually:

=== Native OS ===
- 15
- Aothello
- Arcade Volleyball
- Astro Lander
- Biniax 2
- BlueCube4D
- Brickomania
- Cave Story
- Chip World
- Color Lines
- Commander Koon [Commander Keen]
- Connect Four - Zero Gravity
- Digger
- Dooom
- Game & Watch - Formula 1
- HexaVirus
- Manic Miner
- MineSweeper
- mRPG
- Mushroom Roulette
- New RAW [Another World]
- Quake
- Rubido
- SameGoo
- SomeTris
- Spartak-Chess
- Spear of Destiny
- Spoout
- szSokuban760
- szSudoku760 [Sudoku Platinum]
- TCGS Car
- The Last Mission
- TowerToppler [Nebulus]
- Vectoroids
- Vorton
- Wolfenstein 3D
- Wubtris
- XRickOO [Rick Dangerous]

=== Dingux ===
- Duke Nukem 3D

=== Emulation ===
==== Official ====
- GBA
- NES
- Neo Geo
- SNES
- CPS-1
- CPS-2
- Mega Drive/Genesis

==== Community-based ====
- Amiga
- Atari 2600
- Atari 5200
- Atari 7800
- Atari 8-bit computers
- Atari Lynx
- ColecoVision
- Commodore 64
- Game Boy and Game Boy Color
- Game Boy Advance
- Genesis / Mega Drive and Mega-CD (Dingux only)
- Magnavox Odyssey 2
- MSX (openMSX Dingux)
- Neo Geo
- Neo Geo Pocket
- PC Engine
- PlayStation (Dingux only)
- Master System, SG-1000 and Game Gear (in progress, working for most games)
- WonderSwan and WonderSwan Color (in progress, working for most games)
- ZX Spectrum (GP2Xpectrum for Dingux, Unreal Speccy Portable for native OS)

===== Arcade games =====
- Centipede and Millipede
- CPS-1
- CPS-2
- FinalBurn Alpha (Dingux only)
- MAME
- Mikie (Konami arcade game)
- Pac-Man and Ms. Pac-Man

=== Video player ===
- Video containers: RMVB, RM, AVI, WMV, FLV, MPEG, MP4, ASF, MOV
- Video codecs: WMV1, WMV3, WMV7, WMV8.1, WMV9, MP42, mp4v, DIV3, DiVX5, XViD, MJPG, MPEG1, MPEG2

=== Audio player ===
- Audio formats: MP3, WMA, APE, FLAC, WAV, AC3, MOD, S3M, XM
- Channels: Stereo
- EQ Function

=== Photo viewer ===
- Supports JPG, BMP, GIF, PNG File Formats

=== Text reader ===
- Supports TXT file formats (English and Chinese)
- Supports English text to speech
- Further functions include bookmarking, auto browsing, font sizing, and it can open while music is playing.

=== Radio receiver ===
- FM Radio
- Wide frequency range from 76.0 to 108.0 MHz, support manual/auto channel scanning, FM recording and can keep playing while using other application. User can save up to 40 channels.

=== Audio recording ===
- Voice and radio recording
- Voice recording and supports MP3/WAV formats.

=== Other ===
- Supports SWF File Format (only Flash 6)
- SD Card virus protection: The system protects itself from viruses by scanning the SD Card.
- USB 2.0 Port: Supports Windows 2000/XP/Vista as well as Mac OS X

=== File browser ===
- Allows you to browse the files on your Dingoo, such as games, music, videos, photos, and voice recordings

== Firmware ==
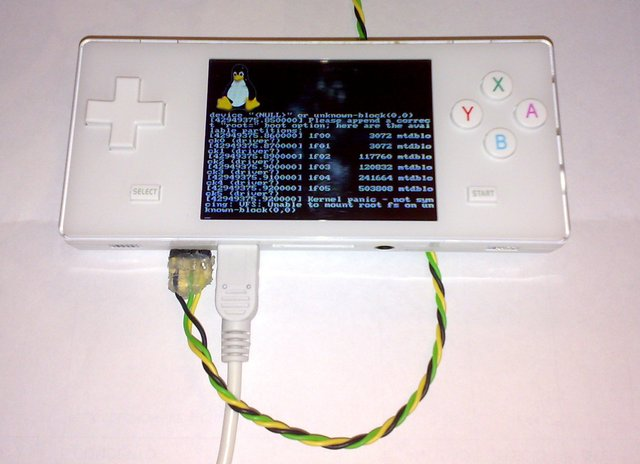
A Dingoo running an alpha version of a Linux port

=== Official firmware ===
- Firmware V1.01
- Firmware V1.02
- Firmware V1.03
- Firmware V1.10 (Added Multi-Language Support)
- Firmware V1.11 (Added Korean Language Support)
- Firmware V1.20 (Y & B button bug fix and more)
- Firmware V1.22

=== Unofficial firmware ===
Team Dingoo released the first unofficial firmware with user customizable theming possibilities. The system files were moved from hidden memory to an accessible memory location, allowing users to change the graphical settings. This firmware is updated regularly.

- a320-1.03TD-3
- a320-1.03TD-2
- a320-1.03TD-1

=== μC/OS-II ===
The native operating system of the Dingoo A320 is a variant of μC/uOS-II, a low-cost priority-based pre-emptive real time multitasking operating system kernel for microprocessors, written mainly in the C programming language. It is mainly intended for use in embedded systems. All official software for the Dingoo A-320 (including its emulators) run on μC/OS-II.

=== Linux ===
A Linux kernel was generally released by Booboo on Google Code on May 18, 2009.

A dual boot installer called "Dingux" was released June 24. This allows for dual booting the original firmware or Linux without the need for connection to a PC.

Enthusiasts have successfully run Linux versions of many games, including Prboom engine (Doom, Hexen, Heretic), Build engine (Duke Nukem 3D, Shadow Warrior), Quake, Dodgin' Diamonds 1 & 2, Biniax 2, GNU Robbo, Super Transball 2, Defendguin, Waternet, Sdlroids, Spout, Tyrian, Rise of the Triad, Open Liero, REminiscence, Blockrage, and the OpenBOR game engine.

The Dingoo can run emulators: ScummVM, SMS Plus, Gmuplayer, FinalBurn Alpha, Gnuboy, GpSP, MAME, PSX4ALL, Snes9x, PicoDrive, openMSX, GP2Xpectrum, FCEUX and VICE.

== See also ==
- List of handheld game consoles
- Similar portable Linux kernel-based gaming devices:
  - GP32
  - GP2X
  - GP2X Wiz
  - GP2X Caanoo
  - Pandora (console)
  - DragonBox Pyra
  - GCW Zero
  - Anbernic RG351
  - Anbernic RG552
- Mi2 (console)
- List of Linux-based, handheld gaming devices
- Linux gaming

== Reviews ==
- Dingoo A320 review by Tech Radar
