= Ingenic Semiconductor =

Chinese semiconductor company

Ingenic Semiconductor Co., Ltd.
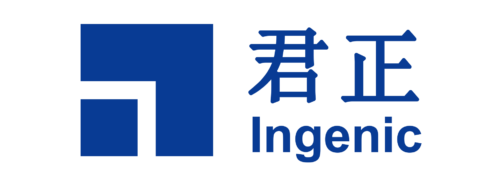
- Native name: 君正集成电路股份有限公司
- Traded as: Ingenic Semiconductor
- Industry: Fabless semiconductors, Semiconductors, Integrated circuit design
- Founded: 2005; 21 years ago
- Founder: Liu Qiang (刘强)
- Headquarters: Beijing, China
- Key people: Liu Qiang (Chairman)
- Products: CPUs (XBurst), SoCs (JZxxx)
- Website: ingenic.com.cn

Ingenic Semiconductor is a Chinese fabless semiconductor company based in Beijing, China founded in 2005. They purchased licenses for the MIPS architecture instruction sets in 2009 and design CPU-microarchitectures based on them. They also design system on a chip products including their CPUs and licensed semiconductor intellectual property blocks from third parties, such as Vivante Corporation, commission the fabrication of integrated circuits at semiconductor fabrication plants and sell them.

== XBurst microarchitecture ==
Early XBurst CPU microarchitectures were based upon the MIPS32 revision 1 and newer models are based on the MIPS32 revision 2 instruction set. It implements an 8-stage pipeline XBurst CPU technology consists of 2 parts:

- A RISC/SIMD/DSP hybrid instruction set architecture which enables the processor to have the capability of computation, signal processing and video processing. This includes the Media Extension Unit (MXU), a 32-bit SIMD extension. All JZ47xx series CPUs with Xburst uA support MXU, except for the JZ4730.
- MXU has its own register set, distinct from the general purpose MIPS registers. It consists of sixteen 32-bit data registers and a 32-bit control register. CPUs which support MXU are used in MIPS Creator single-board computers. They are also present in various tablets, handheld game devices, and embedded devices.

== XBurst2 microarchitecture ==
XBurst2 development was, in summer 2013, expected to be completed by the first half of 2014. However, XBurst2 was eventually introduced in 2020 in the X2000, with the microarchitecture offering a dual-issue/dual-threaded CPU design based on MIPS32 Release 5.

== XBurst-based SoCs ==
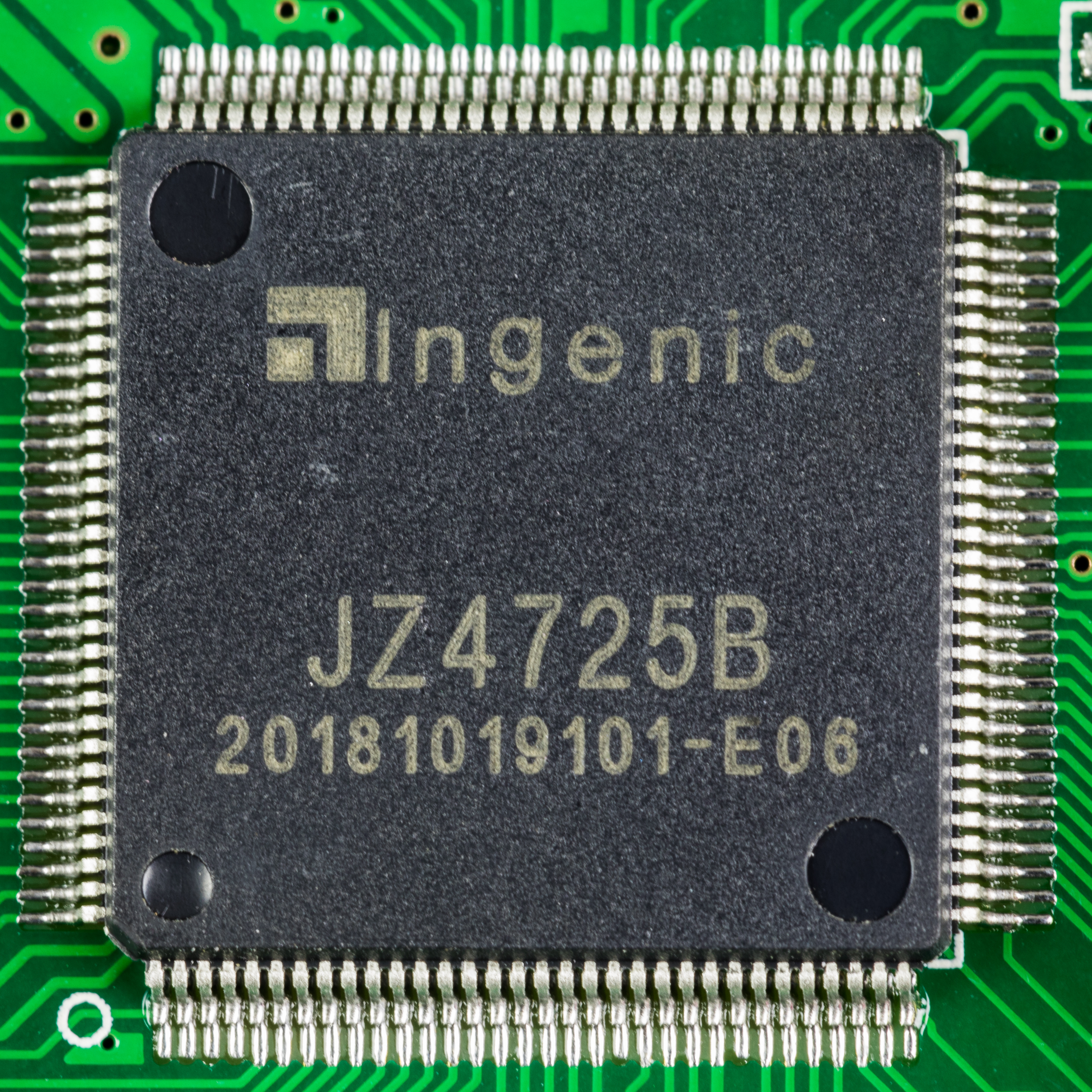
Ingenic JZ4725

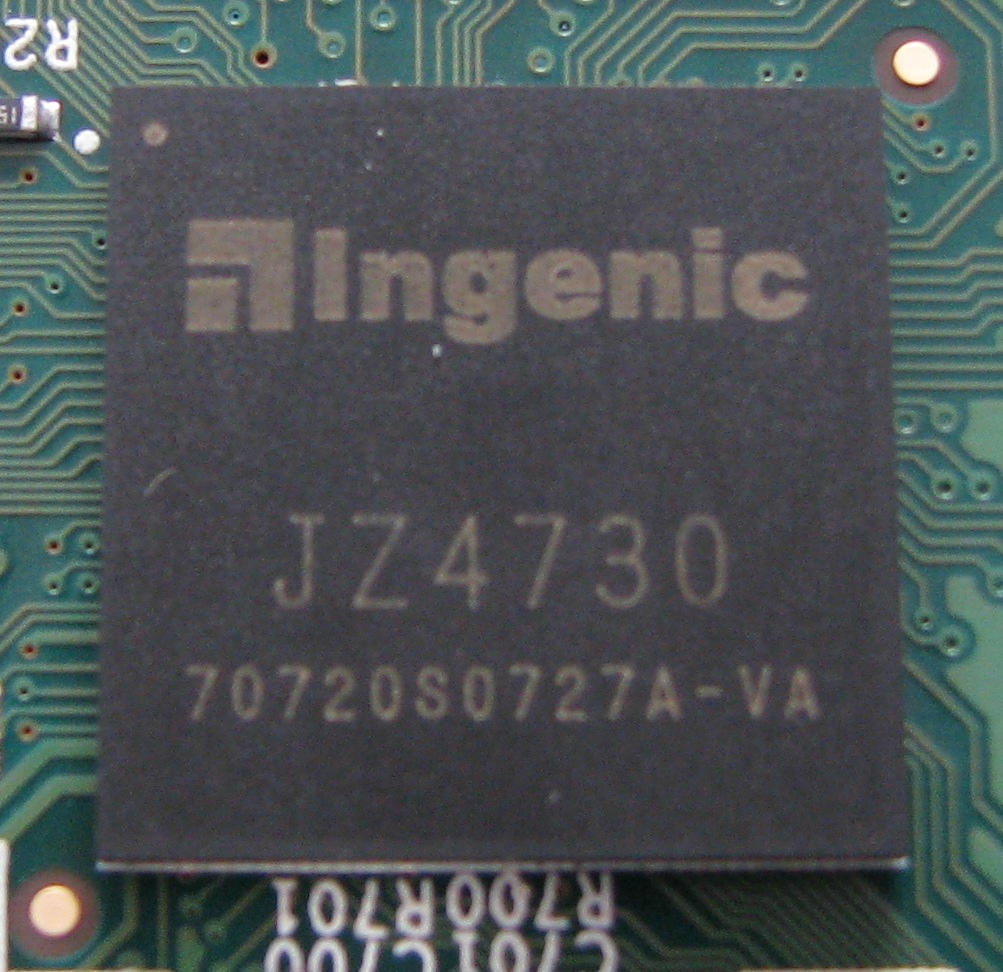
Ingenic JZ4730

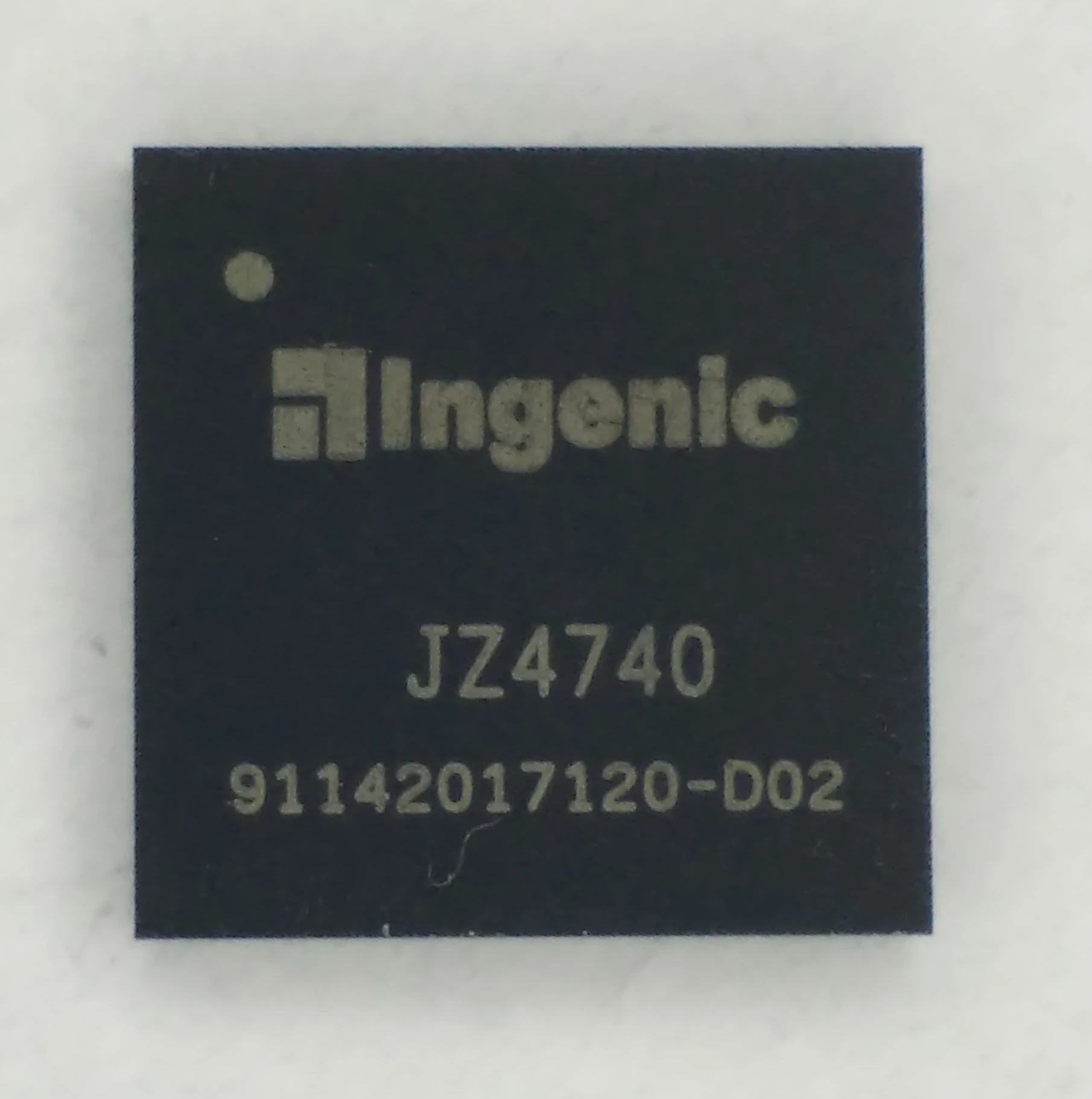
Ingenic JZ4740

SoCs incorporating the XBurst microarchitecture:

Model	Launch	Fab (nm)	XBurst version	MIPS architecture version	Core clock (MHz)	L1 Dcache [kB]	L1 Icache [kB]	L2 cache [kB]	FPU	GPU	VPU	Datasheet	Package	Notes
Jz4730	2006	180	XBurst1	MIPS32 rev1	336	16	16	N/A	N/A	N/A	N/A	Jz4730	BGA256	
Jz4740	2007	180	XBurst1	MIPS32 rev1 + SIMD	360	16	16	N/A	N/A	N/A	N/A	Jz4740	BGA193	adds RMVB, MPEG-1/2/4 decoding capability up to D-1 resolution thanks to SIMD instruction set
Jz4720	2007	180	XBurst1	MIPS32 rev1 + SIMD	240	16	16	N/A	N/A	N/A	N/A	Jz4720	COB186	
Jz4725B	2009	160	XBurst1	MIPS32 rev1 + SIMD	360	16	16	N/A	N/A	N/A	N/A	Jz4725	QFP128	
Jz4750	2009	180	XBurst1	MIPS32 rev1 + SIMD2	360	16	16	N/A	N/A	N/A	480p	Jz4750	BGA256	adds TV encoder
Jz4755	2009	160	XBurst1	MIPS32 rev1 + SIMD2	400	16	16	N/A	N/A	N/A	576P	Jz4755	QFP176	second core is for video processing only
Jz4760	2010	130	XBurst1	MIPS32 rev1 + SIMD2	528	16	16	N/A	yes	Vivante GC200	720p	JZ4760	BGA345	second core is for video processing only, IEEE754-complient FPU
Jz4760	2010	130	XBurst1	MIPS32 rev1 + SIMD2	600	16	16	N/A	yes	Vivante GC200	720p	JZ4760B	BGA345	second core is for video processing only, IEEE754-complient FPU
Jz4770	2011	65	XBurst1	MIPS32 rev2 + SIMD2	1000	16	16	256	yes	Vivante GC860	1080p	JZ4770	BGA379	1080p video decoding unit for h.264, VC-1 and VP8 (a secondary 500 MHz MIPS processor with SIMD extension)
Jz4775		65	XBurst1	MIPS32 rev2 + SIMD2	1000	32	32	256	yes	X2D Core	720p	JZ4775	BGA314	720p video decoding unit for h.264, VC-1 and VP8 (a secondary 500 MHz MIPS processor with SIMD extension)
Jz4780	2012	40	XBurst1	Dual MIPS32 rev2 + SIMD2	1200	32 each	32 each	512	yes	PowerVR SGX 540	1080p	JZ4780	BGA390	Dual core (SMP) XBurst CPU, 1080p video decoding unit for h.264, VC-1 and VP8 (a secondary 500 MHz MIPS processor with SIMD extension)
x1000	2015	65	XBurst1	MIPS32 + SIMD	1000	16	16	128	yes			x1000	BGA190	LPDDR 32/64MB, SLCD interface, Camera interface, Audio Codec up to 192 kHz
x2000	2020	28	XBurst2	Dual MIPS32 + SIMD	1500	32 each	32 each	512	yes		1080p	x2000	BGA270	LPDDR2/3 128/256MB

=== Adoption ===
XBurst1-based SoCs are commonly used in tablet computers, portable media players, digital photo frames and GPS devices:

The JZ4730 CPU is used in the Skytone Alpha-400 and its variants. The Jz4720 is utilized in the Copyleft Hardware project Ben NanoNote. Another popular device, the Dingoo gaming handheld, uses the JZ4732, a de facto JZ4740. Game Gadget is using the JZ4750. Velocity Micro T103 Cruz and T301 Cruz 7-Inch Android 2.0 Tablets used JZ4760. The JZ4770 SoC is used in several of the Ainol Novo 7 Android tablets and 3Q Tablet PC Qoo! IC0707A/4A40. JZ4770 SoC is also used in the dedicated handheld Neo Geo X and open source handheld GCW Zero running on OpenDingux. The JZ4780 is used in ImgTec's MIPS based single-board computer (SBC); The Creator CI20

Manufacturer	Model(s)	Type	CPU	Operating System
Qi Hardware	Ben NanoNote	Handheld Computer	Ingenic JZ4720	OpenWRT (custom)
Skytone	Skytone Alpha-400	Netbook	Ingenic JZ4730	Linux
Dingoo Digital	Dingoo	Handheld Game Console	Ingenic JZ4732	OpenDingux
Blaze Europe	Game Gadget	Handheld Game Console	Ingenic JZ4750	unknown
Velocity Micro	Cruz T103, T301	Tablet	Ingenic JZ4760	Android 2.0
GCW	GCW Zero	Handheld Game Console	Ingenic JZ4770	OpenDingux
unknown	Neo Geo X	Handheld Game Console	Ingenic JZ4770	unknown
ImgTec	Creator CI20	Single-board computer	Ingenic JZ4780	Linux

== See also ==
- Lantiq
- Cavium
- Loongson
- Qualcomm Atheros
- MediaTek
- OpenWrt
- Ainol
- Ben Nanonote
