= Ben NanoNote =

Pocket computer

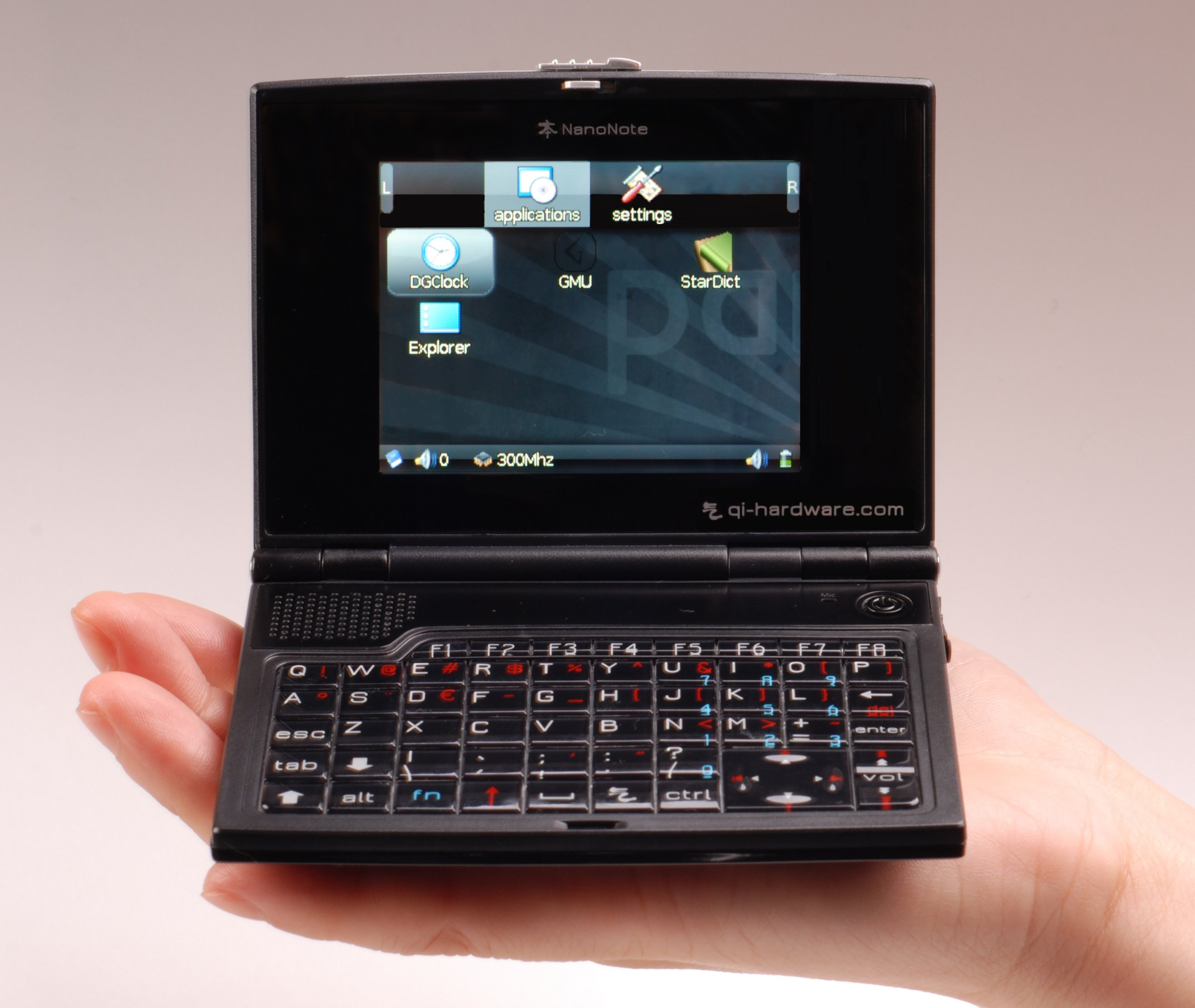
- A Ben NanoNote held on the palm of a hand
- Manufacturer: Qi hardware, Sharism At Work Ltd
- Type: Handheld computer
- Released: Early 2010
- Operating system: OpenWrt custom edition
- CPU: 336 MHz XBurst JZ4720
- Memory: 32 or 64 MB low SDRAM
- Storage: 1 SDHC slot, 2048 MB internal NAND flash
- Connectivity: USB 2.0, and IEEE 802.15.4 WPAN (as accessory)
- Website: en.qi-hardware.com/wiki/Ben_NanoNote

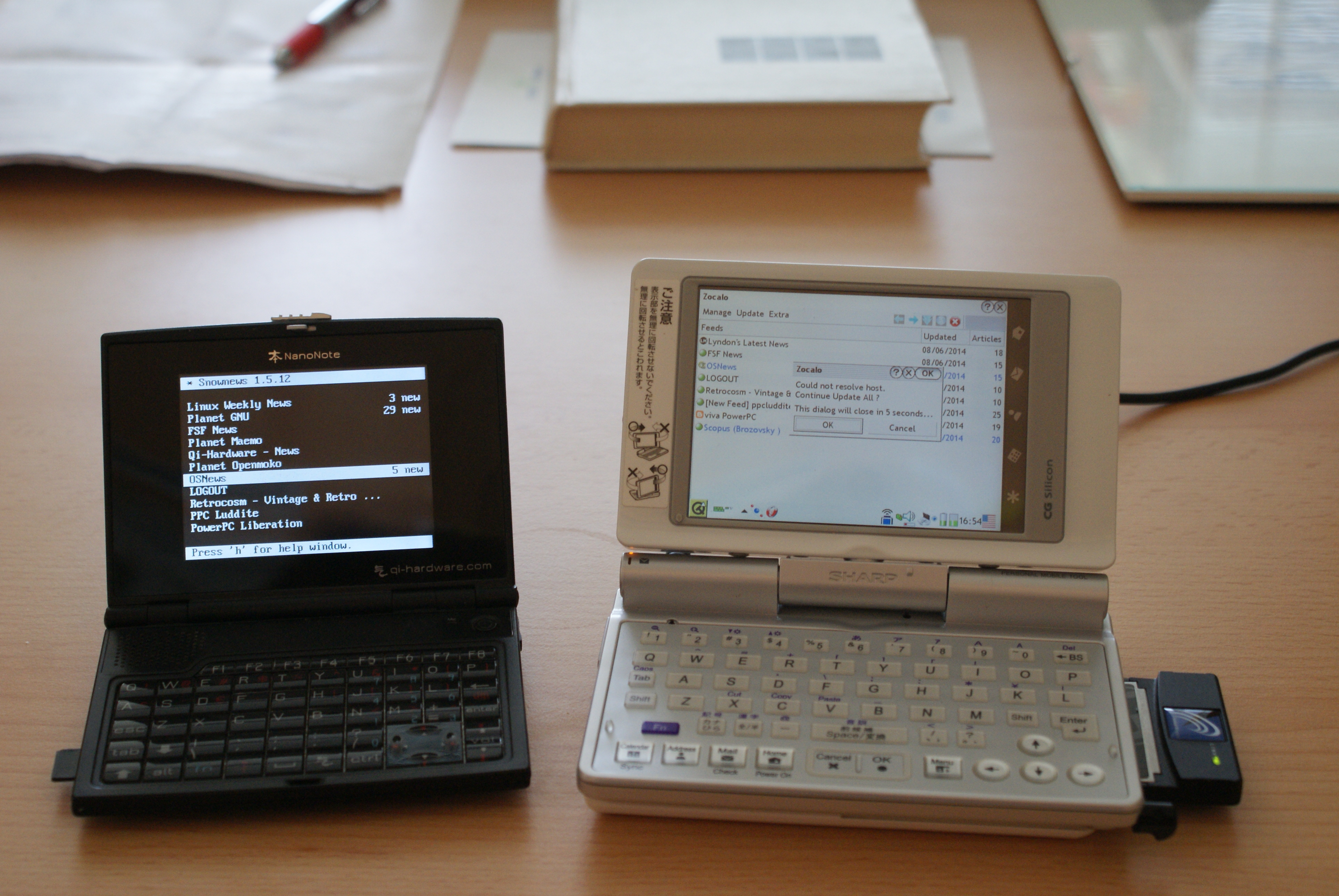
A Ben NanoNote next to a Zaurus SL-C760

The Ben NanoNote (officially the 本 NanoNote) is a pocket computer using the Linux-based OpenWrt operating system. An open-source hardware device developed by Qi Hardware, it has been called possibly "the world's smallest Linux laptop for the traditional definition of the word." The device is also notable for being one of the first on the market made of entirely copyleft hardware.

The computer takes its name from the Chinese character běn (本), translated as "an origin or the beginning place."

== History ==
Originally the hardware was developed by a third party as a digital dictionary. After the effort of several Qi Hardware developers, the design was freed as open source hardware while using free and open source software.

The product used to be manufactured by Qi hardware and Sharism At Work Ltd. As of 2011, more than 1,000 units had been sold.

== Software ==
The device is shipped with the OpenWrt software stack; the custom compilation includes a graphical menu called gmenu2x, with other graphical and command line applications available from the menu.

OpenEmbedded is also available through the Jlime Linux distribution. The Pyneo software stack, a Debian-like distribution aimed for mobiles, has been ported. The MIPS architecture port of Debian Linux can be run on the NanoNote. NanoNixOS is a cross-compiled distribution based on the package manager Nix (package manager).

== Reception ==
After the 2010 Ben NanoNote introduction, reviewers praised its small size and low cost (US$99), but also criticized the device for its initial lack of networking and for its extremely modest data storage and random-access memory (RAM), relative to other contemporary devices.

== Product development ==
Because the device lacked wireless connectivity, implementing this was one of the first goals for the Qi Hardware movement. This add-on, the Ben WPAN, was developed by Werner Almesberger, and consists of mainly an IEEE 802.15.4 subsystem, made of two boards: a USB dongle (ATUSB) connected to the computer and another card connected to the SDIO port of the device (ATBEN).

All source code, documentation and test procedures, software and hardware schematics are available under copyleft licenses.

Universal Breakout Board (UBB), is a printed circuit board (PCB) shaped like a microSD card, focused on do it yourself (DIY) projects and general purpose interfacing using the available MultiMediaCard (MMC) or Secure Digital Input Output (SDIO) port.

So far two hacks have been published. The first is an integration with a 443 MHz radio frequency (RF) transceiver for power socket control use. The second is a mix of bit banging and Secure Digital Input Output (SDIO) with direct memory access (DMA) features turning the SD card slot into a Video Graphics Array (VGA) port.

As the Ben NanoNote uses an Ingenic JZ4720 processor it supports booting from USB without use of the NAND flash memory.

== Derivatives ==
The SIE board is an adaptation of the NanoNote. It has twice the memory and features a XC3S Xilinx FPGA on board. It is based on the XBurst JZ4725 SoC, which has more I/O pins available due to not having a keyboard.

== Technical specifications ==
- XBurst JZ4720 336 MHz MIPS processor from Ingenic Semiconductor
- 3.0" 320x240 pixels colour TFT LCD
- 32 MB SDRAM
- 2 GB NAND flash memory
- 1 SDHC slot (SDIO/DMA capable)
- 59-key keyboard
- Stereo headphones connector, mono speaker and microphone
- USB Client 2.0 High-Speed Device, Mini B connector
- 3.7 V, 850 mAh Li-ion battery
- Overall dimension (lid closed): 99 * 75 * 17.5mm. (display: 7.5mm, keyboard: 10mm)
- Weight: 126 g (4.4 oz) (including battery)

== See also ==
- List of open source computing hardware
- List of open source hardware projects
- Milkymist
