= Anbernic RG35XXSP =

Handheld clamshell game console

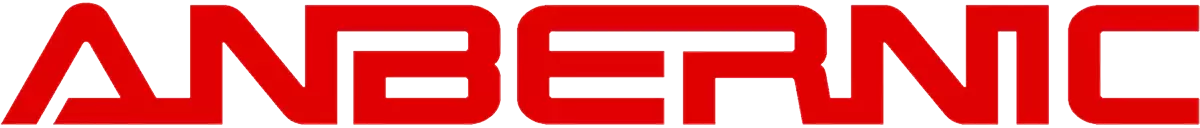
- Manufacturer: Anbernic
- Type: Handheld game console
- Generation: Ninth
- Released: June 2024
- Operating system: Linux
- CPU: Allwinner H700 @ 1.5 GHz
- Memory: 1 GB
- Removable storage: MicroSD card

The Anbernic RG35XXSP is a Linux-based handheld game console created by the Chinese company Anbernic and released in 2024. It is a redesign of a similar system sold by the company, the RG34XXSP, without dual analog sticks. Design-wise, it is considered a clone of Nintendo's 2003 console, the Game Boy Advance SP. However, unlike its inspiration, it is a digital-only console and plays ROMs stored on MicroSD card through the use of emulation. It also has a standard-definition IPS screen and supports games up to the Dreamcast era, with additional buttons to support this capability. It is sold in several different colors, some of them utilizing transparent plastic. The RG35XXSP was positively received by critics, who praised its design, powerful processor, high-quality screen and price point, but noted that its emulation abilities were hit-or-miss, with performance suffering without the use of RetroArch, and the lack of an analog stick rendered certain games unplayable. The subsequent RGSP model is even closer to a Game Boy Advance SP in size and functionality

== Specifications ==
The RG35XXSP is similar in size to the Game Boy Advance SP. While slightly wider and thicker, it is still able to fit tightly in an official SP carrying case. It also adds additional buttons - two extra action buttons, X and Y, two extra shoulder buttons, and a menu button for returning to the console's main menu. Rather than a power switch, it has a power button and reset key, as well as a rocker switch for controlling volume rather than a slider. On the top of the system, there is a USB-C port for charging and a Mini-HDMI port that serves as a television connector.

The system's screen is 3.5 inches and has an aspect ratio of 4:3 at a resolution of 640x480. Its onboard emulator adds a border to the screen to simulate the aspect ratio of Game Boy or Game Boy Advance games. Internally, it uses an Allwinner H700 chipset running a Linux-based OS, and has up to 8 hours of battery life.

== Reception ==
Wesley Copeland of GamesRadar+ rated the console 4/5 stars, praising its screen as one of its best features and the main draw of the console. He called it a "monumental steal" and "a beaming neon middle finger to the bloated aftermarket prices" of the Game Boy Advance SP due to its US$64.99 price point. Matt S. of Digitally Downloaded said that the console's greatest feature was its battery, calling the system one of Anbernic's finest "by a long way", and added that he purchased one despite his ROG Ally rendering many emulator consoles obsolete. Joel Loynds of Dexerto also rated the console 4/5 stars, calling it an "absolute joy to play games on".

Damien McFerran of Time Extension rated the RG35XXSP 9/10 stars, saying that its screen was greatly superior even to the improved AGS-101 model of the Game Boy Advance SP, which featured a fully backlit screen, in color, viewing angles and contrast. Also praising the console's overall design and battery life, he called it one of Anbernic's best products up to that point. However, he expressed concerns with the console's tactile button feedback, calling it "off-putting", as well as the lack of analog stick. He also called the console's sleep mode "half-baked", saying its stock OS needed more time in the oven. Despite this, he recommended it as an alternative for people seeking to purchase a Game Boy Advance.

== Legacy ==
The system received an additional redesign in 2026 as the RGSP. The redesign has a smaller chassis that is almost exactly the size of the Game Boy Advance SP and a narrower screen scaled exactly to the GBA aspect ratio.
