= Anbernic RG552 =

Handheld game console

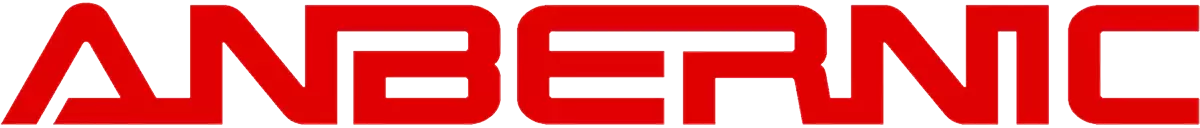
- Manufacturer: Anbernic
- Type: Handheld game console
- Generation: Ninth
- Released: 2022
- Operating system: Linux, Android
- CPU: Rockchip RK3399 @ 1.8GHz
- Memory: 4GB
- Removable storage: SD card

The Anbernic RG552 is a dual-boot Linux and Android-based handheld game console created in China by Anbernic. A retrogaming emulation console, it is the successor to the RG351, and is a larger console in general, about the size of a Nintendo Switch Lite. It has more powerful hardware and increased screen size in a 5:3 aspect ratio. Critics praised the system for its build quality, but criticized its price to performance ratio, saying that it would likely be eclipsed by other systems with increased emulation capabilities such as the Ayn Odin and Retroid Pocket 2+.

== Specifications ==
The system measures 20 by 8.5 by 2 centimetres (7.87 in × 3.35 in × 0.79 in) and weighs about 350 grams (0.77 lb). It has a 5.36-inch HD touchscreen with a resolution of 1920x1152, giving it a 5:3 aspect ratio. It is the first portable Anbernic console to have an active heat sink and fan. It can boot into the Linux-based Batocera interface or Android, which also has access to the Google Play store to download games. It is also capable of Stadia streaming. The system has about 4 hours of battery life.

== Reception ==
Gerald Lynch of TechRadar rated the system 4/5 stars, praising it for its performance boost over its predecessor. He called it "a near-complete gateway to all sorts of gaming experiences", and stated that its build quality rivaled Nintendo products. However, he criticized the system for bundling paid emulators without licenses and called its lack of Bluetooth "frustrating".

Damian McFerran of Nintendo Life praised its screen as "superb" but called the battery life low. He also criticized the lack of 5 GHz Wi-Fi, which prevented the smoothest experience while streaming. Wesley Copeland of Heavy called it a "premium product" with the specifications "more than enough to impress", commenting that Android was "by far the better operating system choice" on the console, saying that Linux needed "some meaty patches".
