= Werner Almesberger =

Austrian computer programmer and hardware designer

- Born: August 13, 1967 (age 58); Zurich, Switzerland
- Other name: wpwrak
- Occupation: Programmer
- Known for: Linux Kernel, GCC

Werner Almesberger (born 13 August 1967) is an Austrian free software computer programmer and an open-source hardware designer/maker. He is mainly known as a hacker of the Linux kernel.

Contributions to Linux (free software projects) include the LILO boot loader, the initial RAM disk (initrd), the MS-DOS file system, much of the ATM code, the tcng traffic control configurator, the UML-based simulator umlsim, and the Openmoko (a version of Linux for completely open, low-cost, high-volume phones).

== Involvement in the Linux kernel ==
While a PhD student in Communications at the Swiss Federal Institute of Technology Lausanne (EPFL) he did contributions to several key pieces in the early days of the Linux kernel, in particular as developer of DOS file system, LILO bootloader (the most used Linux bootloader during the youth of the Linux kernel project) and initrd initial RAM disk.

== Differentiated Services on Linux ==
Werner Almesberger wrote the code to support differentiated services on Linux.

== Linux ATM ==
Almesberger was the leader of the asynchronous transfer mode network on Linux project, which has been part of the Linux system since 1995.

== Openmoko ==
Werner Almesberger was a system architect for Openmoko, the first project to create a smartphone platform using free software. It used the Linux kernel, with a graphical user environment which uses X.Org Server, and the Matchbox window manager. The project also released full schematics of the open phone design.

== Recent work ==
Almesberger contributes as the architect of several open source hardware Qi hardware community projects, like implementing an IEEE 802.15.4 subsystem for Ben NanoNote made up of two boards.

In 2013 he started developing the Anelok password safe and, in 2014, he joined the Neo900 open smartphone project where he assists on a broad range of technical and related issues, and he now divides his time between these two projects.

== Life ==
He lives in Argentina, doing trips around the world from time to time, for talks in conferences (like being keynote speaker at Linux Symposium in 2008), and for hardware and software work.
