= GCW Zero =

Linux-based handheld video game console

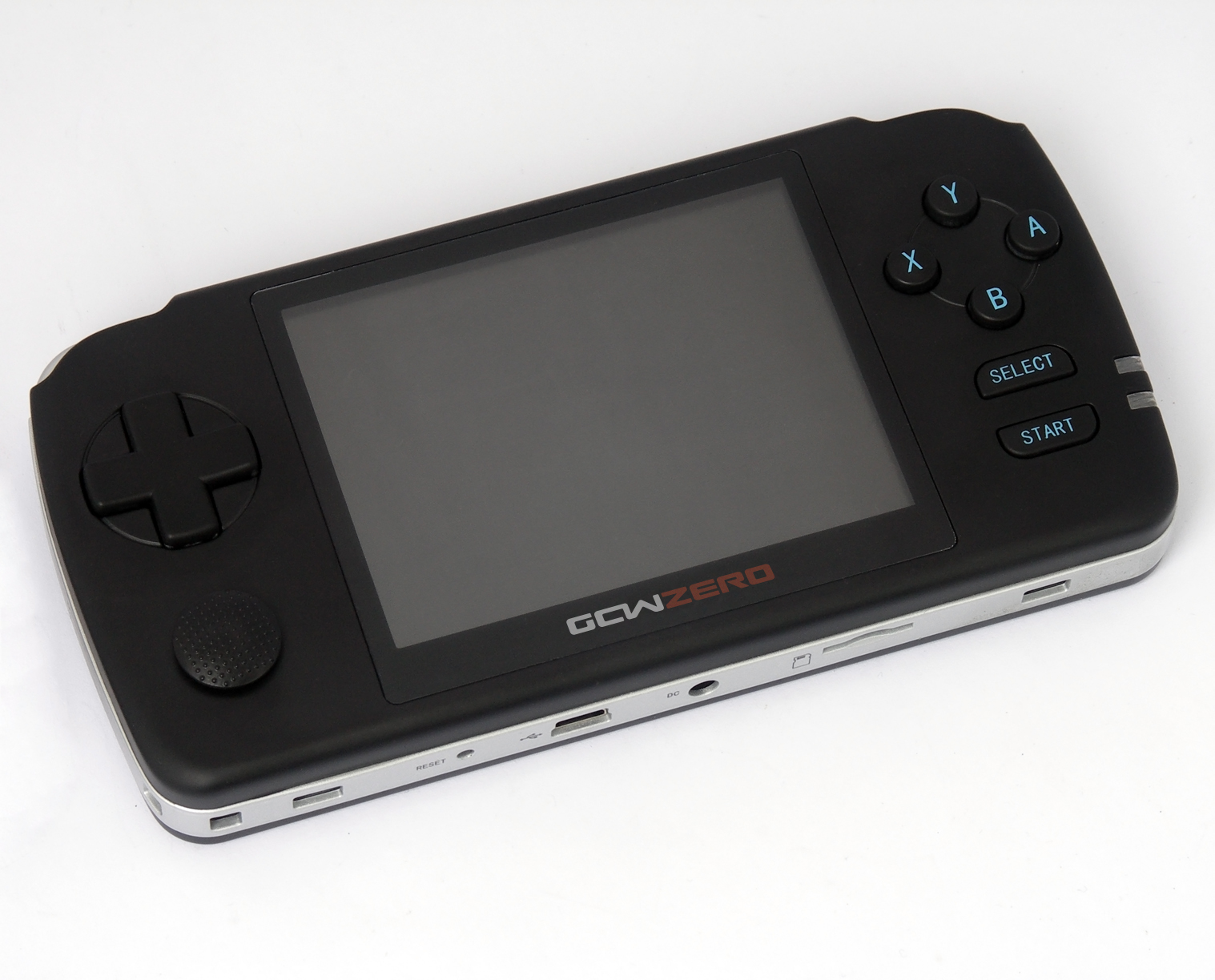
- Manufacturer: Game Consoles Worldwide
- Type: Handheld game console
- Operating system: OpenDingux
- CPU: Ingenic JZ4770(MIPS) @ 1 GHz
- Memory: 512 MB DDR2
- Storage: 16 GB, 32 GB (special edition)
- Removable storage: Secure Digital card (microSDHC up to 32 GB, micro SDXC of 64 GB)
- Display: 320 x 240 pixel, 4:3 aspect ratio, 3.5 inch LCD, HDMI, analog TV out
- Graphics: Vivante GC860
- Sound: Speakers, microphone
- Input: Accelerometer (g-sensor), vibration motors
- Connectivity: Mini USB 2.0 OTG, Mini HDMI 1.3 out, 3.5 mm (mini jack) A/V port for earphone and analog TV-out, Wi-Fi 802.11 b/g/n 2.4 GHz
- Power: 2200 mAh battery
- Dimensions: 143 by 70 by 18 millimetres (5.63 in × 2.76 in × 0.71 in)
- Website: www.gcw-zero.com

The GCW Zero is a Linux-based open-source handheld video game console created by a start up, Game Consoles Worldwide. The GCW Zero was funded by a successful crowdfunding campaign on kickstarter.com on 29 January 2013 with US$238,499 collected, originally aiming for $130,000. The project was created by Justin Barwick. The device was eventually released that year.

== Concept ==
The GCW Zero is designed to play games by homebrew/indie game developers, as well as run emulators for classic gaming systems. The software infrastructure is open-source and available on GitHub.

Supported systems include game consoles such as the Neo Geo, Mega Drive, Master System, Game Gear, Nintendo Entertainment System, Super Nintendo Entertainment System, Game Boy, Game Boy Color, Game Boy Advance, PlayStation, MSX, as well as arcade machines via the emulator Final Burn Alpha. Version 1.8 of ScummVM added GCW Zero support.

== Special Edition ==
Prior to the Kickstarter campaign there was a limited run of 150 Special Edition units. There are two notable differences: Special Edition text under the GCW Zero screen logo and a 32 GB internal microSD card versus the 16 GB of later production units. A common problem with these Special Edition units is a sticking directional pad in the down direction. Common fixes for this issue include the application of a small amount of dielectric grease in the affected friction area or official 3D printed replacement buttons from the GCW Zero store on Shapeways.

== Reception ==
Reviews have generally been positive, and focused on the emulation capabilities of the device. Steve Tilley, writing at the Toronto Sun, is troubled by the need for copyright-infringing ROMs, but thought highly of the device, describing it as like "holding a chunk of my childhood in the palm of my hand". He also describes the device as unintuitive to use. Tilley repeated these thoughts while presenting a segment for Reviews on the Run where he scored the device 7.5/10; his co-host, Raju Mudhar agreed. David Heywood, writing at Micro Mart, praised the device's excellent build quality, and its use of an operating system which was already well established for handheld consoles.

The GCW was noted for the limited availability of game titles since the release.

== See also ==
- Comparison of handheld game consoles
- Linux gaming
- Handheld game console
- Similar portable Linux kernel-based gaming devices:
  - GP2X Wiz
  - Caanoo
  - Pandora
  - DragonBox Pyra
  - Dingoo
  - Anbernic RG351
  - Anbernic RG552
