= JXD P861 =

- Developer: JXD
- Manufacturer: JXD
- Type: Tablet PC
- Released: 2013
- Introductory price: ≈$120 USD
- Operating system: Android 4.2.2
- CPU: MTK8312, Dual Core, 1.3 GHz
- Memory: 512MB RAM + 4GB ROM
- Display: 7-inch, 800x480 five-point capacitive touchscreen
- Input: Touchscreen
- Camera: 0.3 MP Front Camera, 0.3 MP Back Camera
- Touchpad: Touchscreen
- Connectivity: WiFi headphone jack Micro USB; MicroSD card slot SIM card slot
- Power: 2500 mAh/3.7V
- Website: JXD MID

The JXD P861 is a 7-inch Android tablet PC produced by JXD and released in 2013.

== Features ==
The P861 features a 7-inch, five-point capacitive touchscreen, a 0.3-megapixel front camera, and a 0.3-megapixel rear camera. It is equipped with an MTK8312 dual-core 1.3 GHz chipset, 512MB RAM, 4GB ROM, integrated WiFi, and a 2500mAh battery. The system runs on Android 4.2.2.

== Revisions ==
About a month after the release of the JXD P861, JXD released the JXD P1000M, which was equipped with a 7-inch, five-point 800x480 touchscreen, an MTK6572 dual-core 1.2 GHz chipset, and a battery capacity of 3650 mAh.

Later, the JXD P1000S was released in the Chinese market. It was equipped with an internal 2100mAh battery plus a removable 1960 mAh battery.

== See also ==
- JXD
- HTC Flyer
