= Imagination Creator =

2014 family of single-board computers

Creator Ci20
- Released: November 2014 (Updated May 2015)
- Introductory price: £50, US$65
- Operating system: Debian 7, Android KitKat 4.4
- CPU: Dual-core 1.2 GHz MIPS32 processor, 32k I&D L1 cache, 512k L2 cache
- Memory: 1 GB DDR3
- Storage: 8 GB Flash
- Graphics: PowerVR SGX540 GPU
- Website: www.imgtec.com/creator

Creator is a family of single-board computers developed by Imagination Technologies to promote educational research and software development based on the MIPS architecture. The first board in the platform, the Creator Ci20, was released in August 2014. A second development kit called Creator Ci40 was introduced through a Kickstarter campaign in November 2015.

== Hardware ==
=== Creator Ci20 ===
The Creator Ci20 board is based on an Ingenic JZ4780 mobile-class application processor, which contains a dual-core 1.2 GHz MIPS32 CPU with 32k I&D L1 cache and 512k L2 cache and an IEEE754 Floating Point Unit, coupled with a PowerVR SGX540 GPU. This processor supports MXU, a 32-bit SIMD extension. In addition, the board provides:

- 8 GB of flash and 1 GB of DDR3 SDRAM memory
- Video playback up to 1080p
- AC97 audio, via 4-pin input/output jack and HDMI connector
- Camera interface – ITU645 controller
- Connectivity – 10/100 Mbit/s Ethernet, 802.11b/g/n, Bluetooth 4.0
- HDMI output up to 2K resolution
- 2 x USB – host and OTG
- 14-pin EJTAG connector
- 2 x UART, GPIO, SPI, I2C, ADC, expansion headers

=== Creator Ci40 ===
The Creator Ci40 board is based on a cXT200 chip optimized specifically for IoT applications which contains a dual-core, dual-threaded 550 MHz MIPS interAptiv CPU with 32k I&D L1 cache and 512k L2 cache and an IEEE754 Floating Point Unit coupled with an Ensigma C4500 Wi-Fi radio processor. In addition, the board provides:

- 512 MB of NAND flash memory and 256 MB DDR3 SDRAM
- 1 x micro SD card
- 802.11b/g/n/ac 2x2 Wi-Fi, 802.15.4 6LoWPAN dedicated chip, Bluetooth 4.1 (Classic + Smart, respectively)
- Dedicated TPM chip
- 1 x RJ45 Ethernet port
- 1 x 3.5mm input/output jack, 1 x S/PDIF input/output connector
- 32 x GPIO, 2 x mikroBUS i/f, 4 x PWM, 1 x SPI, 2 x UART, 2 x I2C, 5 x ADC, expansion headers, 14-pin EJTAG connector, 9 x indicator LEDs (7 x I/O, 1 x MCU),
- 1 x micro USB 2.0 OTG

== Software ==
All Creator boards support the Creator IoT Framework, an open source software package based on the LWM2M protocol developed by the Open Mobile Alliance.
