= JXD =

Chinese electronics manufacturer

JinXing Digital CO.Ltd
- Company type: Private
- Industry: Consumer electronics
- Headquarters: Shenzhen, Guangdong, China
- Area served: North America, South America, Europe, Asia, Middle East, Africa, Oceania
- Products: Tablet PC, Game Consoles, MP3, MP4 players and other electronics
- Services: OEM Service Offered (Contract Manufacturing)
- Revenue: US$2.5 Million - US$5 Million
- Number of employees: 101 - 200 People
- Website: www.jxd.hk

JinXing Digital CO.Ltd or Jianghang Digital (commonly referred to as JXD, Chinese: 金星电子有限公司) is a Chinese manufacturer of consumer electronics based in Shenzhen, Guangdong.

== History ==
Established in 1995, Jinxing Digital Co. Ltd is a manufacturer that specializes in the production of MP3 players and other consumer electronic products.

In 2005, the company started manufacturing flash MP4 players, HD MP4 and PMPs.

JXD's first product to garner interest from retro gamers was the JXD 301, which had a Blackfin 533 MHz processor and could emulate a wide variety of retro video game consoles in a handheld format.

== Android products ==
JXD produce a range of Android tablets which use a gaming console formfactor.

JXD started manufacturing tablets and gaming handhelds running on the Android OS in 2011. They are one of the first manufacturers to release an Android 4.0 firmware (Ice Cream Sandwich) for their tablets.

=== 2012 ===
- JXD S7100
- JXD S601
- JXD V5200
- JXD S5110
- JXD S5100
- JXD S603
- JXD S602
- JXD V5200
- JXD 300 b
- JXD S9100

=== 2013 ===
- JXD S5300
- JXD S7300
- JXD S5110b
- JXD S502b
- JXD S602b
- JXD S7800A
- JXD S5800

=== 2014 ===
- JXD T9006
- JXD P3000G
- JXD T9002
- JXD T9000
- JXD T8009
- JXD T9003
- JXD T7000
- JXD T7001
- JXD T8000L
- JXD P300G
- JXD P3000L
- JXD P2000L
- JXD P200G
- JXD P300R
- JXD P3000F
- JXD P3000S
- JXD P861
- JXD P863
- JXD S7800B

=== 2016 ===
JXD S192

=== Cancelled ===
- JXD P2000L
