= Pocket Dream Console =

Handheld game console

- Manufacturer: Conny Technology Co., Ltd.
- Type: Closed-system handheld game console
- Released: ^{JPN} August 3, 2006
- Media: None
- CPU: Sunplus 16-bit SPG 240 series chipset
- Storage: None
- Sound: Sunplus SPG 240 integrated sound
- Dimensions: Width: 10.3 cm x Height: 5.2 cm x Depth: 2.4 cm
- Website: www.conny.com.cn/main.html

The Pocket Dream Console is a small handheld game console created by Conny in 2004. The system was released by several companies such as Takara Tomy. It is available in different colors.

Contrary to popular belief, the console was released outside of Japan and was sold until 2011. The system was released by Takara Tomy in Japan, Videojet in France, and Anncia in the United States. In Germany, the PDC is rebranded as the Pocket Star LCD - Spielkonsole 30in1 under the MGT (Mobile Games Technology) brand by importer PEARL. Models of the system have between 30, 40, 50, 100, and 200 games.

== System overview ==
=== Games ===
The PDC is a closed system with 100 built-in games, mostly unofficial clones of other popular titles, including clones of Lode Runner, Arkanoid, Puzz Loop, Sokoban, Bomberman and Nintendogs. Joe Ma, the clone of Puzz Loop, was later directly licensed by Mitchell Corporation likely out of fear of a lawsuit. The advertised line-up includes:

- Action
- Venture
- Sport
- Relax
- Puzzle
- Table

=== CPU ===
Sunplus 16-bit SPG 240 Series chipset

=== I/O ===
- A/V port: The system can be connected to a TV or other equipment with a custom cable for composite video and mono audio and is sold separately. It uses a mini USB B connector.
- Mini headphone jack (2.5 mm).
- Buttons: D-pad; A, B and menu buttons; two shoulder pads and volume control.
- 2" backlit TFT LCD screen.

=== Power ===
- 3 AAA batteries.

=== Display ===
- Manufacturer: AU Optronics
- Size: 2 or 2.5 inch (depends on the version)
- Full color
- Resolution: 320x240
- Pixel positioning: delta
- Number of contacts: 33
- Backlight
- color: blue, red, purple, orange, pink and white

=== Audio ===
- One built-in speaker

== See also ==
- Mi2 console
