= Ayn Odin =

Handheld video game console

- Manufacturer: Ayn
- Type: Handheld video game console
- Generation: Eighth generation
- Released: 2022
- Introductory price: $200 (Lite) $240 (Base) $290 (Pro)
- Operating system: Android
- CPU: Mediatek Dimensity D900 (Lite); Qualcomm Snapdragon 845 (Base, Pro)
- Memory: 4 GB (Base); 6 GB (Lite); 8 GB (Pro)
- Removable storage: SD card
- Successor: Odin 2

The Ayn Odin is an Android-based handheld video game console created in China by the company Ayn. A retrogaming emulation and mobile gaming console, it is slightly smaller than the Nintendo Switch. It was released in three models of increasing price, the Lite, Base, and Pro. The product of a successful Indiegogo campaign, it was critically praised at the time of release as one of the most powerful handheld consoles for the price, able to reliably play games from the sixth generation of home consoles. A successor, named the Ayn Odin 2 was released in fall 2023.

== Specifications ==
Measuring 224 by 95 by 15 millimetres (8.82 in × 3.74 in × 0.59 in), the console uses a 6-inch 1080p touchscreen in all models. It has clickable asymmetrical analog sticks, as well as stacked shoulder buttons and analog triggers. The system's case is illuminated on the outside by blue LED lighting accents.

The system has an optional "Super Dock" accessory that allows it to play on a larger screen, similar to the Switch dock. The dock also contains dedicated ports for GameCube and N64 controllers, as well as Ethernet and USB-C/SATA.

== Reception ==
Gerald Lynch of TechRadar rated the console 5/5 stars, calling it one of the most powerful gaming handhelds of all time, and praising the build quality and ability to play a vast number of games, while criticizing its processor as "slightly older".

James Trew of Engadget called the system "the retro gaming handheld to beat", commenting that F-Zero GX could run at full speed on the device and praising its ability to emulate the GameCube and PlayStation 2 libraries while also being well-made and reasonably priced.

Will Greenwald of PCMag called it a system with "loads of potential", although commenting that it was "fairly limited out of the box", requiring "extensive sideloading". Alan Zhang of 4Gamer.net praised the system's build quality and buttons, but called it weaker than recent smartphones.

Community support continues for the device. On July 17, 2026, the community Android distribution LineageOS added official support for the device - upgrading it to Android 16 (LineageOS 23.2).
