= Mali-400 MP =

ARM Holdings GPU design

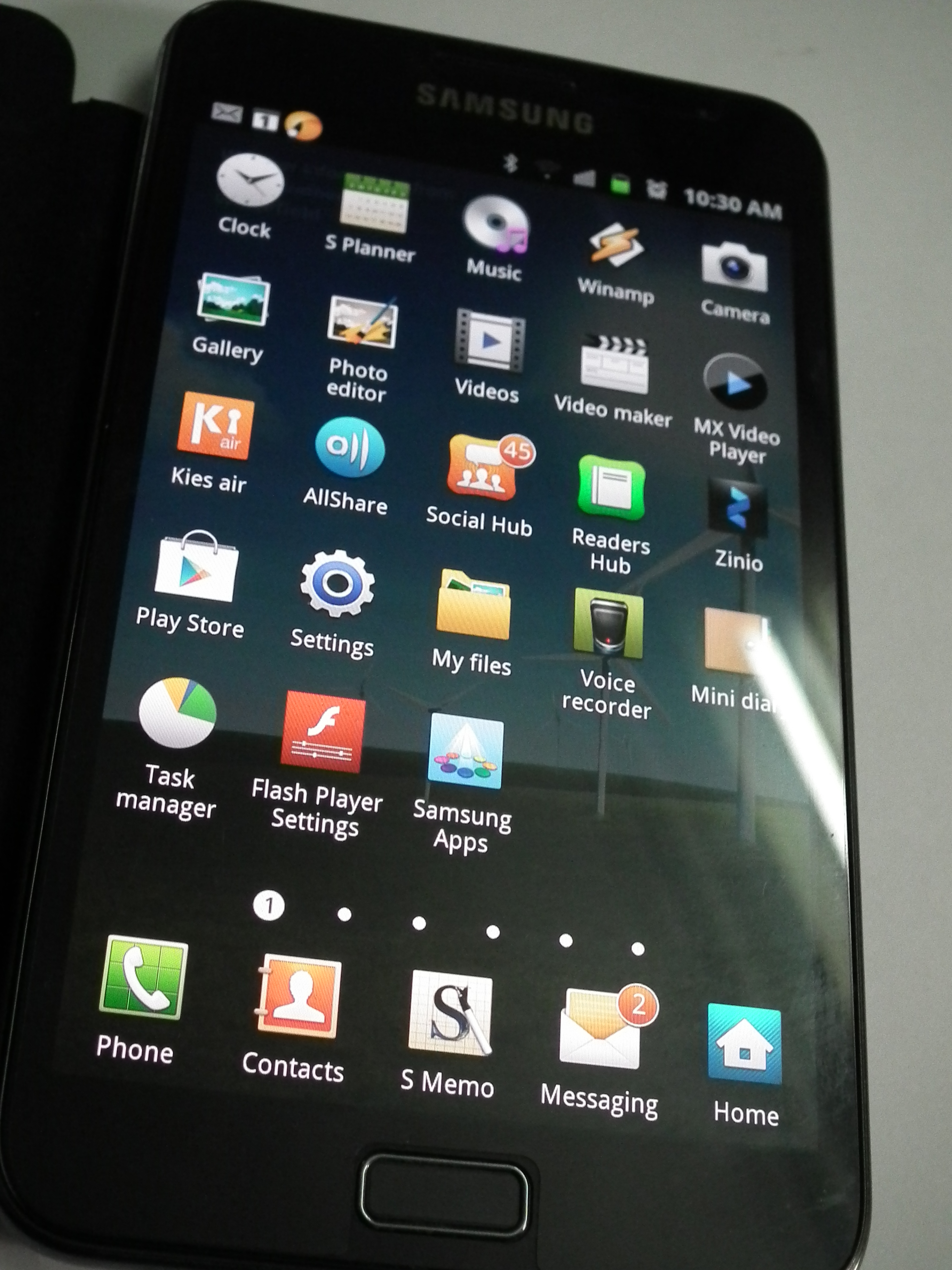
Samsung Galaxy Note GT-N7000, released in 2011, with a Mali-400 MP inside

The Mali-400 MP is a Mali-series GPU IP-block designed by ARM Holdings. It was the first Mali GPU to offer multi-core support and the world's first OpenGL ES 2.0 conformant multi-core GPU. Capable of supporting resolutions up to 1080p with low power and bandwidth consumption, it was widely used in low-cost mobile devices in the late 2000s and early 2010s, becoming one of the most shipped mobile GPUs of all time.

The architecture features one dedicated vertex processor, while the fragment processor count is configurable from one to four (denoted as Mali-400 MP1 through MP4). Clock frequencies range from 200 MHz to 600 MHz, delivering between 1.2 and 5.4 GFLOPS per fragment processor.

ARM Holdings does not manufacture the physical chips. Instead, they license the design to partners who incorporate the IP into their own System-on-a-Chip (SoC) designs. Unlike many other GPU designs, the Mali-400 MP is a pure 3D engine that renders graphics into memory, requiring a separate display controller within the SoC to manage the output.

The Mali-400 MP has been utilized in numerous SoCs and devices, including the Samsung Galaxy S2 and Galaxy S3.

== Specifications ==
Feature	Value	Description
Anti-Aliasing	4x AA 16x AA	4x Multi-Sampling with virtually no performance drop.
API Support	OpenGL ES 1.1/2.0	
Bus Interface	AMBA AXI	
L2 Cache	8KB - 256KB	Configurable L2 cache optimized for graphics data traffic
Memory System	MMU	Memory Management Unit
Core Count	1-4 Fragment Shaders, 1 Vertex Shader	
