= Anbernic =

Chinese gaming console manufacturer

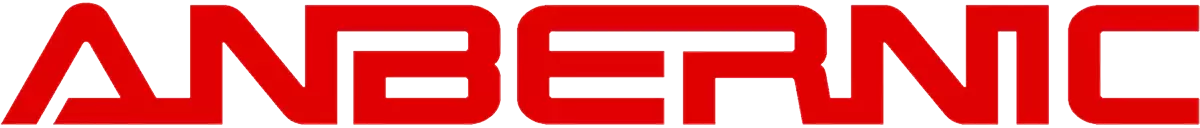
- Logo used since 2017
- Founded: 2017
- Headquarters: Shenzhen, China
- Parent: Shenzhen YangLiMing Electronic Technology Co.
- Website: anbernic.com

Anbernic is a Chinese handheld gaming console company founded in 2017 in Shenzhen by Shenzhen YangLiMing Electronic Technology Co.

The company is known for producing devices that emulate video game systems from the first five generations, such as the NES, Sega Genesis, Game Boy, SNES, PlayStation, and Nintendo 64, as well as more recent consoles from the seventh generation, like the PlayStation Portable and Nintendo DS. More recent handhelds are able to do much more, including being able to play 6th generation consoles such as the PlayStation 2 and GameCube, as well as the Nintendo 3DS.

== History ==
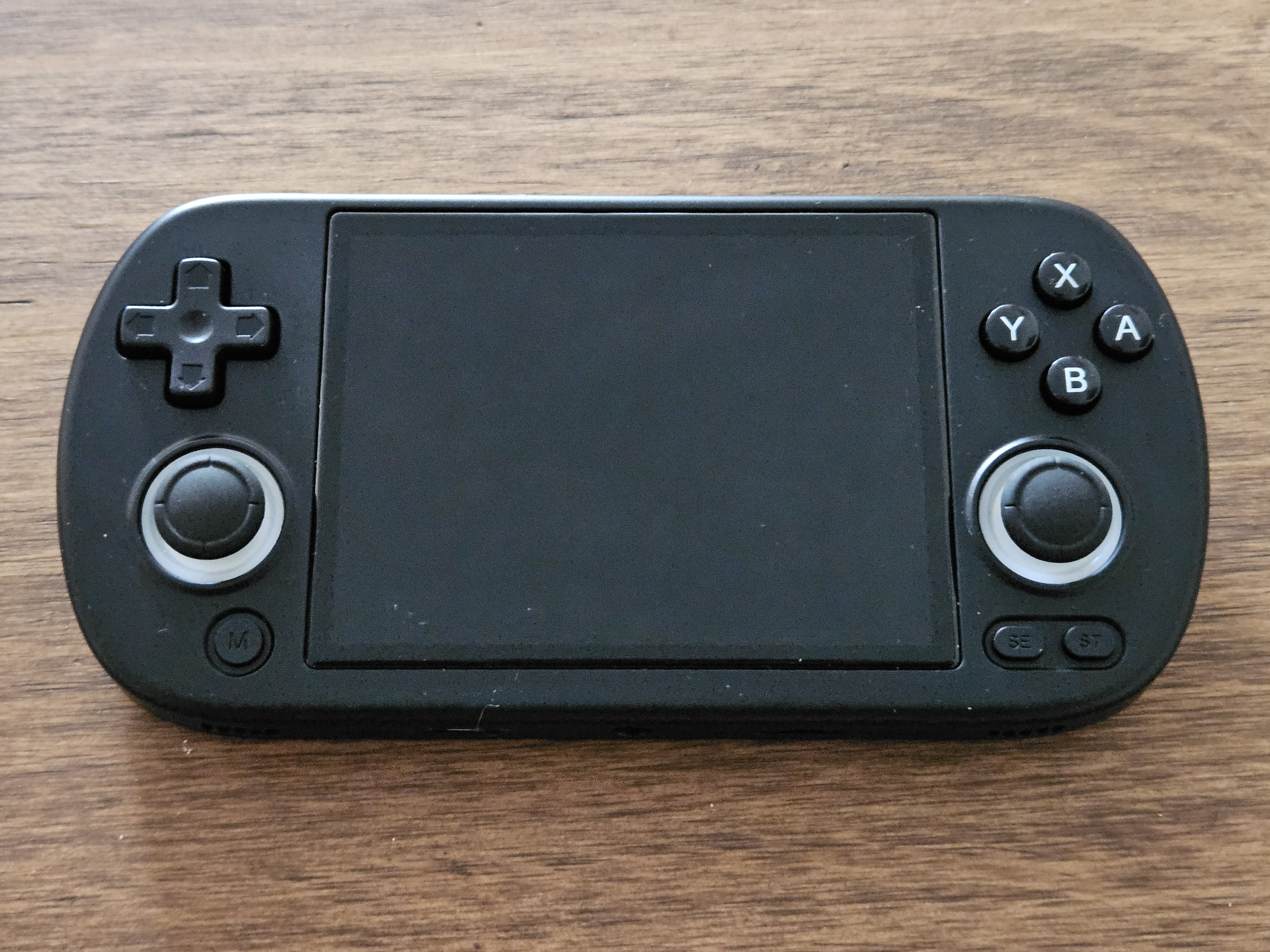
An Anbernic RG40XX model launched in 2024.

The Anbernic trademark was registered in 2017 by Chinese manufacturer Shenzhen YangLiMing Electronic Technology Co., Ltd, which released its first handheld console, the Retro Game (RG), that same year. The brand gained prominence after launching a series of popular retrogaming devices, including the RG351P, RG353V, and RG35XX models. The company said it released an average of 4-5 models per year since founding.

In December 2018, American rapper Soulja Boy launched the emulator console SouljaGame Console, which was actually a rebranded version of existing consoles developed by Anbernic. The project was shut down less than a month after its release.

== Software ==
The devices typically run on Android or Linux-based operating systems and allow users to play classic video games through software emulation.

== Reception ==
Its devices have received acclaim and are listed among the best retro gaming devices.

In 2020, Begina de Miguel of El País Escaparate praised the RG350 model, stating that it "combines high performance with excellent gameplay," and named it the "best retro handheld console" for under 100 euros.

In 2023, Billy Givens and Harry Rabinowitz of Popular Mechanics praised Anbernic's user-friendly interfaces, selecting the RG351P model as the "best handheld game system for emulation." However, they warned that "loading old games into emulators and then selling them in this way is legally questionable in the United States".

In 2024, Jordan McMahon of The Strategist described the Anbernic RG35XX as the "best handheld gaming console for retro gaming," while Keith Stuart of The Guardian referred to Anbernic consoles as "unofficial handhelds" that "play thousands of games –as long as you don't mind about the shady legality of homebrew emulators and downloadable rom files."

== List of devices ==
Model	Release date	SoC	CPU	GPU	Analog	Form Factor	Operating System
RG351P	Sep 2020	Rockchip RK3326	4 * 1.5 GHz Cortex A35	ARM Mali-G31 (2 Execution Engines)	Dual	Horizontal	Linux
RG351M	Jan 2021	Rockchip RK3326	4 * 1.5 GHz Cortex A35	ARM Mali-G31 (2 Execution Engines)	Dual	Horizontal	Linux
RG351V	Feb 2021	Rockchip RK3326	4 * 1.5 GHz Cortex A35	ARM Mali-G31 (2 Execution Engines)	Single	Vertical	Linux
RG 35	Sept 2026	Rockchip RK3326	4 * 1.5 GHz Cortex A35	ARM Mali-G31 (2 Execution Engines)	Dual	Vertical	Linux
RG552	Dec 2021	Rockchip RK3399	2 * 2.0 GHz Cortex A72; 4 * 1.5 GHz Cortex A53	ARM Mali-T860 MP4	Dual	Horizontal	Android 11 & Linux
RG503	Apr 2022	Rockchip RK3566	4 * 1.8 GHz Cortex A55	ARM Mali-G52 (2 Execution Engines)	Dual	Horizontal	Linux
RG353P	Jun 2022	Rockchip RK3566	4 * 1.8 GHz Cortex A55	ARM Mali-G52 (2 Execution Engines)	Dual	Horizontal	Android 11 & Linux
RG353V	Oct 2022	Rockchip RK3566	4 * 1.8 GHz Cortex A55	ARM Mali-G52 (2 Execution Engines)	Dual	Vertical	Linux
RG353M	Aug 2022	Rockchip RK3566	4 * 1.8 GHz Cortex A55	ARM Mali-G52 (2 Execution Engines)	Dual	Horizontal	Android 11 & Linux
RG DS	Dec 2025	Rockchip RK3568	4 * 2 GHz Cortex A55	ARM Mali-G52 (2 Execution Engines)	Dual	Horizontal	Android 14
RG DS Plus	Sept 2026	Rockchip RK3568	4 * 2 GHz Cortex A55	ARM Mali-G52 (2 Execution Engines)	Dual	Horizontal	Android 14
RG Vita Pro	Mar 2026	Rockchip RK3576	4 * 2.2 GHz Cortex A72; 4 * 1.8 GHz Cortex A53	ARM Mali-G52 MC3	Dual	Horizontal	Android 14 & Linux
WIN600	July 2022	AMD Athlon	AMD Athlon Silver 3050e Dali APU	AMD Radeon RX Vega 3	Dual	Horizontal	Windows 11
Unisoc T618 Lineup
RG505	Nov 2022	Unisoc T618	2 * 2 GHz Cortex A75; 6 * 2 GHz Cortex A55	ARM Mali G52	Dual	Horizontal	Android 12
RG405M	Mar 2023	Unisoc T618	2 * 2 GHz Cortex A75; 6 * 2 GHz Cortex A55	ARM Mali G52	Dual	Horizontal	Android 12
RG405V	Sept 2023	Unisoc T618	2 * 2 GHz Cortex A75; 6 * 2 GHz Cortex A55	ARM Mali G52	Dual	Vertical	Android 12
RG Vita	Mar 2026	Unisoc T618	2 * 2 GHz Cortex A75; 6 * 2 GHz Cortex A55	ARM Mali G52	Dual	Horizontal	Android 12
RG Rotate	May 2026	Unisoc T618	2 * 2 GHz Cortex A75; 6 * 2 GHz Cortex A55	ARM Mali G52	None	Vertical	Android 12
Allwinner H700 Lineup
RG35XX Plus	Nov 2023	Allwinner H700	4 * 1.5 GHz Cortex A53	ARM Mali-G31 MP2	None	Vertical	Linux
RG35XX H	Jan 2024	Allwinner H700	4 * 1.5 GHz Cortex A53	ARM Mali-G31 MP2	Dual	Horizontal	Linux
RG28XX	April 2024	Allwinner H700	4 * 1.5 GHz Cortex A53	ARM Mali-G31 MP2	None	Horizontal	Linux
RG35XXSP	May 2024	Allwinner H700	4 * 1.5 GHz Cortex A53	ARM Mali-G31 MP2	None	Clamshell (GBA SP)	Linux
RG40XX H	July 2024	Allwinner H700	4 * 1.5 GHz Cortex A53	ARM Mali-G31 MP2	Dual	Horizontal	Linux
RG40XX V	Aug 2024	Allwinner H700	4 * 1.5 GHz Cortex A53	ARM Mali-G31 MP2	Single	Vertical	Linux
RG CubeXX	Oct 2024	Allwinner H700	4 * 1.5 GHz Cortex A53	ARM Mali-G31 MP2	Dual	Horizontal	Linux
RG34XX	Dec 2024	Allwinner H700	4 * 1.5 GHz Cortex A53	ARM Mali-G31 MP2	None	Horizontal (GBA)	Linux
RG34XXSP	May 2025	Allwinner H700	4 * 1.5 GHz Cortex A53	ARM Mali-G31 MP2	Dual	Clamshell (GBA SP)	Linux
RG35XX Pro	Jun 2025	Allwinner H700	4 * 1.5 GHz Cortex A53	ARM Mali-G31 MP2	Dual	Vertical	Linux
RGSP	Aug 2026	Allwinner H700	4 * 1.5 GHz Cortex A53	ARM Mali-G31 MP2	None	Vertical	Linux
Unisoc T820 Lineup
RG 556	Mar 2024	UNISOC T820	1 * 2.7 GHz Cortex A76; 3 * 2.3 GHz Cortex A76; 4 * 2.1 GHz Cortex A55	ARM Mali-G57 MP4	Dual	Horizontal	Android 13
RG Cube	Jun 2024	UNISOC T820	1 * 2.7 GHz Cortex A76; 3 * 2.3 GHz Cortex A76; 4 * 2.1 GHz Cortex A55	ARM Mali-G57 MP4	Dual	Horizontal	Android 13
RG 406V	Sept 2024	UNISOC T820	1 * 2.7 GHz Cortex A76; 3 * 2.3 GHz Cortex A76; 4 * 2.1 GHz Cortex A55	ARM Mali-G57 MP4	Dual	Vertical	Android 13
RG 406H	Nov 2024	UNISOC T820	1 * 2.7 GHz Cortex A76; 3 * 2.3 GHz Cortex A76; 4 * 2.1 GHz Cortex A55	ARM Mali-G57 MP4	Dual	Horizontal	Android 13
RG Slide	Jun 2025	UNISOC T820	1 * 2.7 GHz Cortex A76; 3 * 2.3 GHz Cortex A76; 4 * 2.1 GHz Cortex A55	ARM Mali-G57 MP4	Dual	Horizontal	Android 13
RG 476H	Sep 2025	UNISOC T820	1 * 2.7 GHz Cortex A76; 3 * 2.3 GHz Cortex A76; 4 * 2.1 GHz Cortex A55	ARM Mali-G57 MP4	Dual	Horizontal	Android 13
Mediatek Dimensity 8300 Lineup
RG 557	April 2025	Dimensity 8300	1 * 3.35 GHz Cortex A715; 3 * 3.20 GHz Cortex A715; 4 * 2.20 GHz Cortex A510	ARM Mali-G615 MP6	Dual	Horizontal	Android 14
RG 477M	Aug 2025	Dimensity 8300	1 * 3.35 GHz Cortex A715; 3 * 3.20 GHz Cortex A715; 4 * 2.20 GHz Cortex A510	ARM Mali-G615 MP6	Dual	Horizontal	Android 14
RG 477V	Dec 2025	Dimensity 8300	1 * 3.35 GHz Cortex A715; 3 * 3.20 GHz Cortex A715; 4 * 2.20 GHz Cortex A510	ARM Mali-G615 MP6	Dual	Vertical	Android 14
Qualcomm Snapdragon G1 Gen 2 Lineup
RG 55G1	Aug 2026	Snapdragon G1 Gen 2	2*Kryo Gold@2.4GHz; 6*Kryo Silver@2.0GHz	Adreno A12	Dual	Horizontal	Android 14
Qualcomm Snapdragon G2 Gen 2 Lineup
RG DDS	Dec 2026	Snapdragon G2 Gen 2	1*Kryo Gold Plus@2.8GHz; 4*Kryo Gold@2.57GHz; 3*Kryo Silver@1.9GHz	Adreno A22	Dual	Horizontal	Android 16
