= RC-5 =

1980s infrared remote control protocol

The RC-5 protocol was developed by Philips in the early 1980s as a semi-proprietary consumer IR (infrared) remote control communication protocol for consumer electronics. It was subsequently adopted by most European manufacturers, as well as by many US manufacturers of specialty audio and video equipment. The other main protocol relevant to consumer electronics is the NEC protocol, which is largely used by Japanese manufacturers.

The RC-5 protocol, when properly implemented, has the advantage that any CD handset (for example) may be used to control any compatible brand of CD player. By comparison, the NEC protocol assigns each brand its own unique header(s) after which may follow any desired command set; this confers the advantage that there cannot be any interference between remote handsets for pieces of equipment made by different manufacturers.

== Protocol details ==
The basics of the protocol are well known. The handset contains a keypad and a transmitter integrated circuit (IC) driving an IR LED. The command data is a Manchester-coded bitstream modulating a 36 kHz carrier. (Often the carrier used is 38 kHz or 40 kHz, apparently due to misinformation about the actual protocol.) The IR signal from the transmitter is detected by a specialized IC with an integral photo-diode, and is amplified, filtered, and demodulated so that the receiving device can act upon the received command. RC-5 only provides a one-way link, with information travelling from the handset to the receiving unit.

The command comprises 14 bits:

- A start bit which is always logic 1 and allows the receiving IC to set the proper gain.
- A field bit which denotes whether the command sent is in the lower field (logic 1 → 0 to 63 decimal) or the upper field (logic 0 → 64 to 127 decimal). Originally a second start bit, the field bit was added later by Philips when it was realized that 64 commands per device were insufficient. Many devices still use the original system.
- A control bit which toggles with each button press. This allows the receiving device to distinguish between two successive button presses (such as "1", "1" for "11") as opposed to the user simply holding down the button and the repeating commands being interrupted by a person walking by, for example.
- A five-bit system address that selects one of 32 possible systems.
- A six-bit command that (in conjunction with the field bit) represents one of the 128 possible RC-5 commands.

The 36 kHz carrier frequency was chosen to render the system immune to interference from TV scan lines. Since the repetition of the 36 kHz carrier is 27.778 μs and the duty factor is 25 %, the carrier pulse duration is 6.944 μs. Each bit of the RC-5 code word contains 32 carrier pulses, and an equal duration of silence, so the bit time is 64×27.778 μs = 1.778 ms, and the 14 symbols (bits) of a complete RC-5 code word take 24.889 ms to transmit. The code word is repeated every 113.778 ms (4096 ÷ 36 kHz) as long as a key remains pressed. (Again, please note that these timings are not strictly followed by all manufacturers, due to a lack of widespread distribution of accurate information on the RC-5 protocol.)

== System and command codes ==
While the RC-5 protocol is well known and understood, what is not so well documented are the system number allocations and the actual RC-5 commands used for each system. The information provided below is the most complete and accurate information available at this time. It is from a printed document from Philips dated December 1992 that is unfortunately not available in electronic format (e.g., PDF), nor is an updated version available. This information is provided so that companies that wish to use the RC-5 protocol can use it properly, and avoid conflicts with other equipment that may or may not be using the correct system numbers and commands.

== Accuracy of information ==
The information in the tables on this page is known to be accurate. Yet it is also clear that there are many gaps in these tables. For example, there is no category listing for DVD players in the system table. (They were not developed until five years after the date of publication of the material from which this information was obtained.) It would obviously be useful therefore to expand these tables with known accurate information. At this time, there are only a few possible ways to do so.

The first would be to capture the IR bitstream from the handset of newer Philips products, such as DVD players and analyze them to see what system number is used. The other would be to use the popular Philips Pronto series of programmable remote controls. These can be programmed to operate Philips components using the RC-5 protocol. Again, the bitstream output of the handset would need to be captured and analyzed. The only other way is to obtain the appropriate documents directly from Philips.

== System number allocations ==
Table 1: System number allocations for RC-5
System number	Description	Command tables
0	TV 1 (TV receiver 1)	2, 3, 4a
1	TV 2 (functions and command numbers as system 0)	2, 3, 4a
2	Txt (teletext)	2, 3, 5
3	Extension to TV 1 and TV 2	2, 4b
4	LV (LaserVision player)	2, 3, 6
5	VCR 1 (video cassette recorder 1)	2, 3, 7a
6	VCR 2 (functions and commands as system 5)	2, 3, 7a
7	Reserved	
8	Sat 1 (satellite TV receiver 1)	2, 3, 8
9	Extension to VCR 1 and VCR 2	2, 7b
10	Sat 2 (functions and commands as system 8)	2, 3, 8
11	Reserved	
12	CD-Video (compact disc video player)	2, 3, 9
13	Reserved	
14	CD-Photo (photo on compact disc player)	2, 3, 10
15	Reserved	
16	Preamp 1 (audio preamplifier 1)	2, 11
17	Tuner (radio tuner)	2, 12
18	Rec 1 (analog cassette recorder)	2, 13
19	Preamp 2 (functions and commands as system 16)	2, 11
20	CD (compact disc player)	2, 14
21	Combi (audio stack or record player)	2, 15
22	Sat (audio satellite)	2, 16
23	Rec 2 (functions and commands as system 18)	2, 11
24	Reserved	
25	Reserved	
26	CD-R (compact disc recorder)	2, 17
27	Reserved	
28	Reserved	
29	Lighting	
30	Reserved	
31	Reserved	

== System number recommendations ==
As can be seen, this information is out of date. There are no longer any systems using CD-Video or CD-Photo, for example. In addition, many of the "Reserved" system numbers have no doubt been allocated by Philips during the intervening 16 years. In order to maintain compatibility, it would be helpful to obtain this information. Unfortunately, this has proven to be difficult.

When designing a product using the RC-5 protocol, the designer must follow the published information as closely as possible. For example, one surround-sound processor from a US specialty manufacturer used the system number 16, designated for "Preamp 1". This caused many problems with home theater installations that also included a separate two-channel preamplifier, which if of US or European origin, would also use the RC-5 protocol with system number 16. If the designers of the surround-sound processor had the correct information available to them, it would have been obvious that a better choice would have been to use system number 19, designated for "Preamp 2", as this would have avoided needless conflict between products.

== Command tables ==
Over time, the information will also be added for the command tables so that all of the available information regarding the RC-5 protocol is gathered in one place. The information in the command tables shown in standard font was obtained from the Philips publication referenced at the bottom of this page. Information in italics is information that is known to be accurate, as it was derived by one of the methods described above.

Table 2: RC-5 commands common to all systems
Command	Function	Command	Function
0 to 9	Digit entries 0 to 9	78	Decrease linear control setting
16	Increase sound volume	80	Move cursor or actuator upwards
17	Decrease sound volume	81	Move cursor or actuator downwards
18	Increase screen/display brightness	82	Switch screen/display menu on
19	Decrease screen/display brightness	83	Switch screen/display menu off
22	Increase bass response	84	Display A/V system status
23	Decrease bass response	85	Move cursor or actuator to the left
24	Increase treble response	86	Move cursor or actuator to the right
25	Decrease treble response	87	Acknowledge; execute function selected by cursor
26	Shift sound balance to the right	118	Select functions defined as sub-mode
27	Shift sound balance to the left	119	Select functions defined as options sub-mode; e.g., calendar, alarm, time
63	Select system mode of RC transmitter	123	Connect two items via Euroconnector
71	Dim local display	124	Disconnect two items connected via Euroconnector
77	Increase linear control setting		

Table 3: RC-5 commands common to all video systems except TV and VCR extension systems 3 and 9^{†}
Command	Function	Command	Function
20	Increase color saturation	95	Select PIP source
21	Decrease color saturation	96	Mosaic/multi-PIP
88	PIP on/off	97	Digital noise reduction of picture
89	PIP shift	98	Store main picture
90	PIP/main picture swap	99	PIP strobe; displays a photo-finish
91	Strobe main picture on/off	100	Recall main stored picture
92	Multi-strobe	101	PIP freeze
93	Main picture frame frozen	102	Step up PIP options and display source
94	3/9 multi-scan: (search for 9 TV pictures and display in 9 PIPs)	103	Step down PIP options and display source

^{†} Commands for video extension systems 3 (TV) and 9 (VCR) which use the common video command numbers are given in Tables 4b (TV) and 7b (VCR).

Table 4a: Additional RC-5 commands for TV 1 and TV 2 (systems 0 and 1)
Command	Function	Command	Function
10	1/2/3 digit entry	59	View data; advance (USA only)
11	Channel/program/freq; 11 (Japan)	60	TXT/TV toggle; 12 (Japan only)
12	Standby	61	System standby
13	Master mute/de-mute	62	Picture crispener (contour boost)
14	Personal preference settings	64	
15	Display user info on screen	65	
28	Increase picture contrast	66	
29	Decrease picture contrast	67	
30	Search up	68	
31	Decrease tint/hue	69	
32	Channel/program up	70	Audio response for speech/music
33	Channel/program down	72	
34	Last viewed program/channel	73	
35	Select stereo sound channel/language	74	
36	Spatial stereo	75	
37	Stereo/mono	76	
38	Sleep timer	79	Select sound functions in sequence
39	Increase tint/hue	104	Alter PIP size step-by-step
40	Switch RF inputs	105	Select vision functions in sequence
41	Store; Vote (France only)	106	Actuate colored or other special keys
42	Display time	107	Actuate function highlighted red
43	Scan forward; increment (USA only)	108	Actuate function highlighted green
44	Decrement (USA only)	109	Actuate function highlighted yellow
45		110	Actuate function highlighted cyan
46	Secondary control/menu (USA only)	111	Index page/white function
47	Show clock	112	Next option
48	Pause	113	Previous option
49	Erase/correct entry	114	
50	Rewind	115	
51	Go to	116	
52	Wind	117	
53	Play	120	
54	Stop	121	
55	Record	122	Store open/close
56	External 1	125	
57	External 2	126	
58		127	Parental access via PIN code

Table 4b: RC-5 commands for TV1 and TV2 extension (system 3) other than those listed in Table 2
Command	Function	Command	Function
10	4 default video settings (Far East)	67	Program 10 (Far East)
11	4 default audio settings (Far East)	68	Program 11 (Far East)
12		69	Program 12 (Far East)
13		70	
14		72	4 default video settings (Far East)
15		73	4 default audio settings (Far East)
20		74	
21		75	
28	Pay TV channel +	76	
29	Pay TV channel −	79	
30	Radio channel +	88	Pay TV channel +
31	Radio channel −	89	Pay TV channel −
32	Tilt cabinet forward 10 degrees max	90	Radio channel +
33	Tilt cabinet backward 10 degrees max	91	Radio channel −
34		92	
35		93	
36		94	
37		95	
38		96	
39		97	
40		98	
41		99	
42		100	
43		101	
44		102	
45		103	
46		104	Tilt cabinet forward 10 degrees max
47		105	Tilt cabinet backward 10 degrees max
48		106	
49		107	
50		108	
51		109	
52		110	
53		111	
54		112	
55		113	
56	External 3	114	
57	External 4	115	
58		116	
59		117	
60		120	External 3
61		121	External 4
62	Change 4:3 picture format to 16:9	122	Channel setting menu
64		125	
65		126	Change 4:3 picture format to 16:9
66		127	

Table 5: RC-5 commands for teletext (system 2) other than those listed in Tables 2 and 3
Command	Function	Command	Function
10	Next page	59	
11	Previous page	60	
12	Standby	61	
13		62	News flash (Antiope function)
14		64	
15		65	
28	Enter page number in memory	66	
29	Sequential display of pages w/stored numbers	67	
30	Sequential display/deletion of pages w/stored numbers	68	
31		69	
32	Exchange (Antiope function)	70	
33	Main index	72	
34	Row zero (Antiope function)	73	
35		74	
36		75	
37		76	
38	Print displayed page	79	
39	Mix Antiope/TV pictures	104	
40		105	
41	Page hold	106	
42	Display time/timed page	107	
43	Large top/bottom/normal	108	
44	Reveal/conceal	109	
45	TV/TXT	110	
46	TV + TXT/subtitle	111	
47		112	
48		113	
49	Erase/correct entry	114	
50		115	
51		116	
52		117	
53		120	
54		121	
55		122	
56		125	
57		126	
58		127	

Table 6: RC-5 commands for a LaserVision system player (system 4) other than those listed in Tables 2 and 3
Command	Function	Command	Function
10	Display picture number/time	59	Freeze segment(s) indicated by picture numbers
11	Display chapter number	60	TXT/TV toggle; RF switch (USA only)
12	Standby	61	
13	Mute/de-mute	62	CX 1, 2, 3; toggle for CX noise reduction
14		64	
15	Display user info. on screen	65	
28	Total shuffle play (TSP) once/repeat once	66	
29	TSP/repeat continuously	67	
30	Select next option	68	
31	Fast run reverse	69	
32	Entry (prepare to program)	70	
33	Auto-stop at pre-programmed point	72	
34	Slow run reverse	73	
35	Select stereo sound channel 1/language 1	74	
36	Select stereo sound channel 2/language 2	75	
37	Still increment reverse	76	
38	Increase speed	79	
39	Decrease speed	104	
40	Slow run forward	105	
41	Still increment forward	106	
42	Fast run forward	107	
43	Automatic search for user choice	108	
44	Search in reverse	109	
45	Open/close lid	110	
46	Search forward	111	
47	Play reverse/play opposite sound track	112	
48	Pause	113	
49	Erase/correct entry	114	
50		115	
51		116	
52		117	
53	Play	120	
54	Stop	121	
55		122	
56		125	
57		126	
58	Clear memory all	127	

Table 11: RC-5 commands for audio preamplifiers 1 and 2 (systems 16 and 19) other than those listed in Table 2
Command	Function	Command	Function
10	GEQ L (graphic equalizer left channel)	67	
11	GEQ R (graphic equalizer right channel)	68	
12	Standby	69	
13	Master mute/de-mute	70	
14	Personal preference settings	72	
15	Display user info on local display	73	
20		74	
21		75	
28	GEQ L+R (graphic equalizer L + R channel)	76	
29	Speaker select	79	Scroll linear sound functions
30	Scratch filter on/off	88	Random noise generator on/off
31	Rumble filter on/off	89	Timer on/off
32	Step function +	90	News timer on/off
33	Step function −	91	
34	Signal path scroll	92	
35	Speaker A on/off	93	
36		94	
37	Scroll surround sound options	95	
38	Sleep timer	96	
39	Speaker B on/off	97	
40	Speaker C on/off	98	
41	Timer program mode	99	
42	Time set mode	100	
43	Timer +	101	
44	Timer −	102	Center channel volume +
45	Open timer memory	103	Center channel volume −
46	Open acoustic control setting memory	104	Delay front to surround increment
47	Select acoustic settings in memory	105	Delay front to surround decrement
48		106	Linear phase
49	Erase/correct entry	107	
50		108	
51		109	
52		110	
53		111	
54		112	
55		113	
56		114	
57		115	
58	Clear memory all	116	
59		117	
60	Dynamic range expand	120	
61		121	
62	Dynamic range compress	122	Tape monitor
64	Surround sound on/off	125	
65	Balance front	126	
66	Balance rear	127	

Table 14: RC-5 commands for a compact disc player (system 20) other than those listed in Table 2
Command	Function	Command	Function
10	Scroll local display cursor	67	
11	Scroll local display function	68	
12	Standby	69	
13	Mute/de-mute	70	
14		72	
15	Display user info on local display	73	
20		74	
21		75	
28	Total shuffle play/repeat once	76	
29	Repeat continuously	79	
30	Select increment	88	
31	Select decrement	89	
32	Next	90	
33	Previous	91	Digital signal processing on/off
34	Index next	92	Music mode (DSP)
35	Index previous	93	Select room acoustics (DSP)
36	Play/program	94	Jazz/s-hall effect (DSP)
37	Speed nominal	95	Pop/s-hall effect (DSP)
38	Increase speed	96	Classic/church music for music/room mode (DSP)
39	Decrease speed	97	Easy/club music for music/room mode (DSP)
40		98	Disco/stadium music for music/room mode (DSP)
41	Store execute	99	
42		100	
43	Scan disc forward	101	
44		102	
45	Open/close tray	103	
46		104	
47	Fast/select disc from cartridge	105	
48	Pause	106	
49	Erase/correct entry	107	Second favorite track selection
50	Rewind/reverse	108	Favorite track selection
51	Scroll local display cursor	109	Title into memory
52	Wind/fast-forward	110	
53	Play	111	
54	Stop	112	
55	Disc 1	113	
56	Disc 2	114	
57	Disc 3	115	
58	Clear memory all	116	
59	Repeat program marked A/B	117	
60	Dynamic range expand	120	Fade in/out audio
61		121	
62	Dynamic range compress	122	
64		125	
65		126	
66		127	

== See also ==
- Remote control
- Consumer IR
