= Mi2 (console) =

Handheld game console

Mi2/PDC Touch
- Manufacturer: Planet Interactive (Benelux); Conny Technology (China); Videojet (France)
- Type: Closed-system handheld game console
- Generation: Seventh generation era
- Released: October 2009
- Introductory price: €99.99
- Media: Flash ROM
- CPU: MIPS
- Memory: 256 MB (Etrontech EM63A165TS-6G Synchronous DRAM (SDRAM))
- Storage: 16GB flash memory 512MB free storage (SAMSUNG K9GAG08U0M-PCB0)
- Removable storage: Mini SD card (optional)
- Display: 3.5" TFT LCD
- Input: Motion, Touchscreen, Microphone
- Camera: 0.3 Megapixels
- Power: 1200 mAh battery
- Online services: Downloadable games were made available
- Dimensions: 14.6cmx7.2cmx2.4cm
- Weight: 160g
- Predecessor: Pocket Dream Console

The Mi2, also branded as PDC Touch, is a handheld game console developed and created by Dutch company Planet Interactive in Benelux and branded as Mi2. The Chinese manufacturer Conny Technology and the French manufacturer Videojet branded it as PDC Touch Media (an officially shortened name for Pocket Dream Console Touch) in France, Germany, Spain, Portugal and the UK. It was released in October 2009, being the successor of the Pocket Dream Console from 2005.

In 2010, and upgraded version, called the Mi2 XL, was released in Benelux only, featuring 5 more games than the original console.

== Overview ==
With a very similar design to the Dingoo, the Mi2/PDC Touch has more features than the Dingoo, such as an accelerometer, a camera and a touchscreen. It also has a 16GB flash memory, with 512MB free memory. The console is aimed at under 11 year olds. When it was launched, it was priced at €99.99 in Benelux. It was then dropped down to €59.99.

== Games ==
The Mi2/PDC Touch features 100 built-in games (Mi2 XL features 105), mostly unofficial clones of other popular titles. When launched there was a promise that extra games could be downloaded (for a fee) from the internet, but it wasn't until September 2010 that this option was realized.

The built in games are of the following categories:

- Animal training
- Balancing
- Bowling
- Brain training
- Camera games
- Colouring
- Drawing
- Educational
- Fashion Design
- Music Mix creation
- Puzzle
- Racing

== Memory and CPU ==
- CPU: MIPS based processor
- Memory: 16GB of which 512MB free for use
- Memory: Mini SD-Card slot
- Memory: SAMSUNG K9GAG08U0M-PCB0 16GB NAND Flash
- Memory: Etrontech EM63A165TS-6G - 16Mega x 16 Synchronous DRAM (SDRAM)

== Features ==
- A/V port: The system can be connected to a TV or other equipment with a custom cable for composite video and mono audio (included).
- Mini USB B connector.
- Mini headphone jack.
- Microphone
- MP3 files for audio/music
- MP4 and AVI files for video
- JPEG files for images, using PhotoFrame
- Buttons: D-pad, shoulder buttons, menu buttons, and four action buttons
- 3.5" backlit TFT LCD screen.
- Touch screen
- Motion sensor
- 0.3 megapixel camera

== Power, Display, Audio and Accessories ==
- Power: Built in 1200 mAh battery
- Display: Full colour
- Display: Resolution: 320x240
- Display: Backlight
- Audio: Headset output
- Audio: Stereo speakers
- Accessories: Touch-screen stylus
- Accessories: Hand-strap
- Accessories: Headset
- Accessories: AV cable

== See also ==
- Pocket Dream Console
