= Biniax =

Free and open source puzzle video game

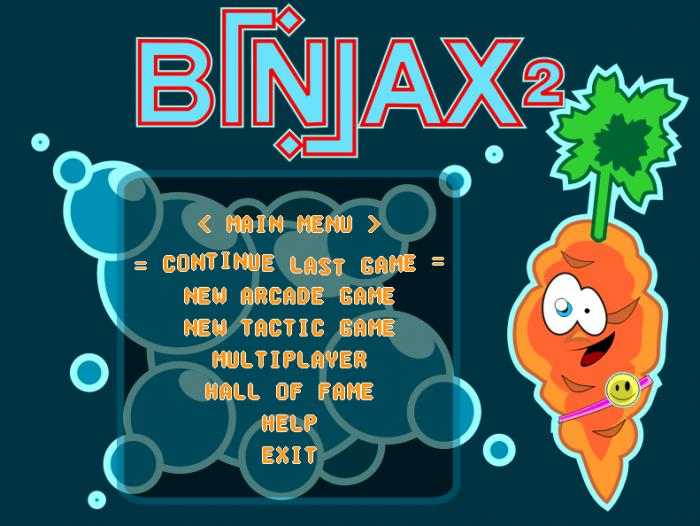
- Biniax 2 title screen
- Developer(s): Jordan Tuzsuzov
- Initial release: 2005, 2007
- Platform: Mobile phone, Dreamcast, Windows, Linux, Amiga, BeOS, GP2X, PSP, Mac OS X
- Type: Puzzle
- License: zlib
- Website: biniax.com

Biniax is a series of free and open-source puzzle video games first released on April 17, 2005. The games Biniax, Biniax 2 and BiniaxMobile are licensed under the zlib license. The first two are coded in C, and the mobile version is in Java ME.

== Gameplay ==
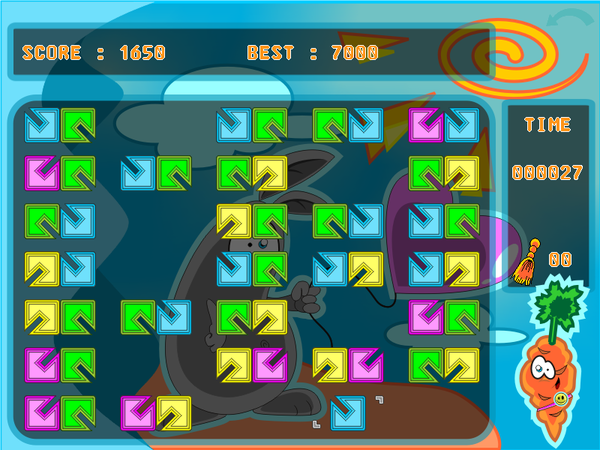
Gameplay screenshot

The game is played on a 7 by 24 grid, which contains empty spaces or pairs of colored elements. There are four colors to choose from: blue, green, red, and yellow, with each pair composed of elements of different colors.

At the start of the game, the player is given one element that they can move to any empty space within the grid.

Pairs of elements matching the player's given element can be selected for removal from the grid. Following a removal, the player is then given a new paired element. Each removal adds to the player's score.

Over time, the field moves downwards, and the game concludes when the player exhausts all available moves, rendering further progress impossible.

== Reception ==
A 2005 review on AllAboutSymbian rated BinaxMobile 75/100.

A review of Biniax-2 at PlneHry.cz in Czech in 2007 rated it 7/10.

In 2007 a Bytten review of Biniax-2 rated the game with a 70% overall score. Biniax-2 was reviewed in 2007 by the Polish Victory Games website and was awarded a silver medal.

FreeGameArchive described in 2007 Biniax mobile as: "Biniax Mobile is one of the best logical-express I've ever played on mobile phone!".

In 2008, Biniax-2 was awarded 3rd place at the Bulgarian Computer Space 2008 festival in the "Offline multimedia" category.

In 2008, a short feature of Biniax-2 in Game Tunnel stated, "... it is definitely the kind of game you will want to have around for any time you have a free minute because it is so fun!".

Biniax was selected in March 2016 as a "HotPick" by Linux Format.
