= Qi Hardware =

Defunct open hardware project

Qi Hardware Inc.
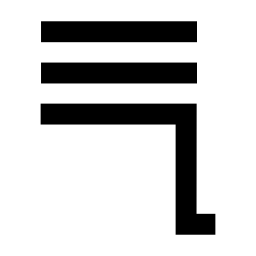
- Type: Public
- Industry: Computer hardware; Computer software; Consumer electronics; Digital distribution
- Headquarters: San Francisco, California, U.S.
- Number of locations: San Francisco, Beijing, Hong Kong, Taipei
- Area served: Worldwide
- Products: Ben Nanonote; Milkymist

Qi Hardware was an organization which produced copyleft hardware and software, in an attempt to apply the Free Software Foundation's GNU GPL concept of copylefting software to the hardware layer by using the CC BY-SA license for schematics, bill of materials and PCB layout data. The project was both a community of popular open hardware websites and a company, founded by Steve Mosher, Jon Phillips, Wolfgang Spraul and Yi Zhang, that made hardware products. Formed from the now defunct Openmoko project, key members went on to form Qi Hardware Inc. and Sharism At Work Ltd. Thus far, the project has released the Ben Nanonote, the Milkymist One, and the Ben WPAN wireless project to create a copyleft wireless platform. The examples of Qi hardware projects are the Ben NanoNote pocket computer, Elphel 353 video camera and Milkymist One video synthesizer.

Qi Hardware was primarily active between 2009 and 2011 before going dormant. It was revived in 2019 and later renamed Qiware. In 2024, its assets were acquired by Phi, a similar organization.
