= Retroid Pocket 2 =

Handheld video game console

- Manufacturer: GoRetroid
- Type: Handheld video game console
- Generation: Eighth generation
- Released: September 2020
- Operating system: Android
- CPU: MediaTek MT6580 (RP2); Unisoc Tiger T310 (RP2+); Unisoc Tiger T610 (RP2S) @ 1.5GHZ
- Memory: 1GB
- Removable storage: SD card

The Retroid Pocket 2 is an Android-based handheld video game console created in China by GoRetroid and released in September 2020. An emulation console, it is capable of playing games from various handheld and non-handheld systems, including all consoles up to the Dreamcast. As the device does not accept game cartridges or discs, the user must supply a ROM image of the games they wish to play. It is the successor to the Retroid Pocket, and has emerged as a prominent handheld console for retrogaming alongside the Anbernic RG351. It is priced at US$84.99, however, a second version, the Retroid Pocket 2+, was released in early 2022, featuring a touchscreen, stronger CPU and RAM, and higher-quality buttons, at a slightly higher price point of US$99. A third version, the Retroid Pocket 2S, was released in mid 2023, featuring even stronger CPU and RAM. Critics praised its low price and build quality, but its outdated Android version (later updated), front end interface, low battery life, and offset analog sticks were noted as points of contention.

== Specifications ==
The Retroid Pocket 2 and its upgraded versions maintain a horizontal form-factor and plastic shell. They also both support Wi-Fi and Bluetooth 4.0, and have a screen resolution of 640x480 with a 4:3 aspect ratio, with a Micro HDMI connector to output to large screens. On release, the Pocket 2 only supported Android 6, but it was updated to Android 8.1 in October 2021. The Retroid Pocket 2+ supports Android 9.0 while the Retroid Pocket 2S supports Android 11.

The system has 3 to 5 hours of battery life per charge.

== Reception ==
Will Greenwald of PCMag gave the Retroid Pocket 2 3.5/5 points, praising its "excellent" build quality and responsive controls, but saying it was difficult to set up properly. He called the price point reasonable, and compared its button layout to the Nintendo Switch when in portable mode. However, he criticized the system's stock interface as "clunky and awkward", and also disliked the pre-loaded RetroidOS, which contained ROMs that were in Chinese due to a "dubious legal loophole". He suggested using the open-source Pegasus front end, but called it a "huge pain" to set up. He also called the battery life unimpressive.

Matt S. of Digitally Downloaded said that while the system was more versatile than the RG350M, it was worse in other areas, calling the emulator organization "chaotic" and noting its plastic construction compared to the aluminum shell of the Anbernic device, as well as having stiffer face buttons. However, he also noted the positive addition of a HDMI output and wireless play.

Damien McFerran of Nintendo Life called the system's Android OS a "double-edged sword" compared to the Anbernic RG351, saying that while it was much more versatile than EmuELEC and 351ELEC, it was sluggish due to the system's weak hardware and required constantly switching to a pointer due to the lack of touch screen. However, he called the extra scope appealing, praising the playability of Android games like AM2R. He criticized the lack of dual analog sticks and a weaker D-pad than the Anbernic.

Brandon Saltalamacchia of Retro Dodo rated the system 9/10, called the system one of the best retro handhelds to date, saying that it "far exceeded our expectations". However, he criticized the need to "constantly change settings" to play certain games. He gave Retroid Pocket 2+ and 2S the same scores, saying that these had become the best retro handhelds under $100.
