= Anbernic RG351 =

Handheld game console

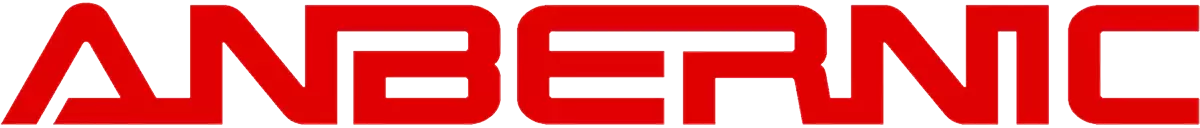
- Manufacturer: Anbernic
- Type: Handheld game console
- Generation: Eighth
- Released: September 2020 (RG351P); January 2021 (RG351M); February 2021 (RG351V)
- Operating system: Linux
- CPU: Rockchip RK3326 @ 1.5GHz
- Memory: 1GB
- Removable storage: SD card

The Anbernic RG351 is a Linux-based handheld game console created in China by Anbernic. The console uses a microSD card for storage and is a digital ROM-only console. It is the successor to the RG350, and has emerged as a prominent handheld console for retrogaming alongside the Retroid Pocket 2, with the screen aspect ratio of some models particularly optimized for Game Boy Advance titles. It is sold in several models with different shells and screen resolutions, but similar internal specifications. Critics have praised its quality and functionality, but criticized certain aspects of its design.

== Specifications ==
The RG351 has several models. The RG351P and more expensive RG351M maintain the same horizontal rectangular form factor, but have a plastic and aluminum shell, respectively. The RG351P lacks internal Wi-Fi, requiring an external dongle. The RG351V has a vertical rectangular form factor more similar to that of the Game Boy, and a higher-resolution 4:3 aspect ratio screen. The RG351MP ("Metal Pro") model also has the same higher-res screen, but in a horizontal form factor.

The screen of the "P" and "M" models is exactly double the resolution of the Game Boy Advance, at 480x320, with a 3:2 aspect ratio, causing games of that system to scale perfectly, but games with a 4:3 aspect ratio to be pillarboxed. The screen of the "V" and "MP" models is a higher resolution 4:3 aspect ratio 640x480 screen. The system uses a RK3326 quad-core, 1.5 GHz CPU, with 1GB of RAM and no onboard storage, requiring an SD card to store games. It can emulate game systems up to the fifth generation of video game consoles, including NES, Game Boy, Game Boy Advance, Neo Geo, Neo Geo Pocket Color, Super NES, Sega Genesis, Nintendo 64, PlayStation, TurboGrafx-16, and PlayStation Portable. However, it has been noted to suffer problems with emulation of the Dreamcast, Nintendo 64 and PlayStation Portable.

The system comes preconfigured with the EmuElec Linux frontend. However, it has been criticized as "sluggish", and there are alternative frontends that improve performance. This includes 351ELEC, an EmuElec fork, and ArkOS, an operating system built on Ubuntu.

Despite a lack of licenses for this, the console usually ships with a large number of games from the supported consoles built-in.

== Reception ==
PCMag rated the RG351P 3.5/5 stars, calling it a "fun" handheld with good build quality and excellent performance. Their criticisms included a lack of Wi-Fi or HDMI out, and the fact that the screen was the same aspect ratio as the GBA, resulting in other games being stretched or pillarboxed.

NintendoLife conducted a hands-on comparison between the RG351M and the Retroid Pocket 2, and criticized the design of the RG351M as too "functional". However, they called its metal case "gorgeous" and praised the built-in Wi-Fi compared to the "P" model, calling its use of an external dongle for Wi-Fi "irksome". They criticized the fact that, unlike the "P" model, it is difficult to hit diagonal inputs in the "M" model's D-pad.

Gizmodo called the RG351V a "super-powered Game Boy", saying that it provides an "excellent retro gaming experience".

Business Insider criticized Amazon third-party sellers who bundled the RG351 with pre-loaded pirated Nintendo ROMs on SD card, causing Amazon to remove some listings for copyright infringement. However, the console itself was praised as not feeling like a "cheap knockoff, despite literally being exactly that".
