= BennuGD =

Video game development platform

- Developer: SplinterGU
- Stable release: 1.0R307
- Written in: C
- Operating system: Windows, Linux, FreeBSD, macOS, Haiku
- Platform: GP2X Wiz, Caanoo, Dingoo, Wii, embedded systems
- Available in: English, Spanish
- Type: Game engine, Compiler
- License: GNU General Public License
- Website: bennugd.org
- Repository: sourceforge.net/projects/bennugd/

BennuGD (also referred as Bennu Game Development or Bennu) is a high-level open-source video game development suite, originally created as a Fenix Project fork by Argentinian hacker SpliterGU. It is officially supported for Windows, Linux, GP2X Wiz, GP2X Caanoo and Dingux, but can also be run on multiple other platforms to some extent, including FreeBSD, Mac OS X, iOS, and consoles such as GP2X, Dingoo A320, and Wii. Most recently BennuGD has been ported to Sega Dreamcast and PlayStation 2.

BennuGD focuses on modularity and portability and makes it easy for both beginners and experienced users to create their own games.

BennuGD is a console application. There are several integrated development environments (IDE) available, but none are officially supported. The package includes a compiler, run-time code, and different shared libraries to extend core functionality.

BennuGD was created as a Fenix Project fork by the Argentinian hacker SplinterGU after some disagreements in the Fenix Project's community.

In January 2010, the first part of a two-part series of articles on BennuGD was published in the Spanish TodoLinux magazine. In February 2010, the second part was published.
