= Bennu (disambiguation) =

Bennu is an ancient Egyptian deity.

Bennu may also refer to:

- 101955 Bennu, an asteroid discovered in 1999
- BennuGD, forked in 2010, a video game development platform
- Bennu Yıldırımlar, Turkish Actress
- Bennu Heron, extinct species of bird
- Bennu Vallis, a Vallis (valley) on Planet Venus
