= GP2X =

Handheld game console

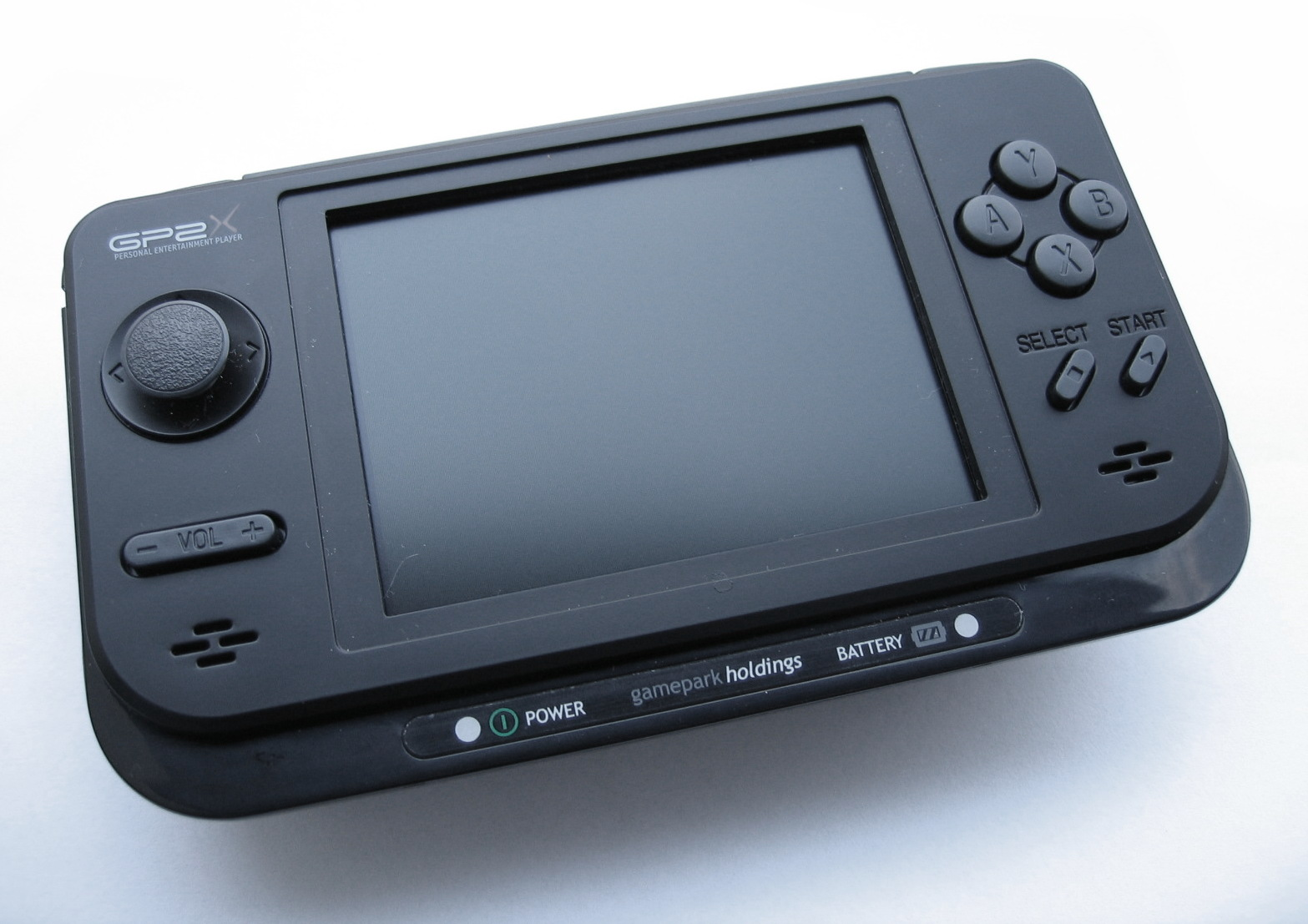
- Manufacturer: GamePark Holdings
- Type: Handheld game console
- Generation: Seventh
- Released: SK: November 10, 2005
- Units sold: Over 60,000
- Media: Secure Digital card
- Operating system: Linux
- CPU: Dual CPU: 200 MHz Host ARM920T; 200 MHz ARM940T
- Memory: 64MB
- Predecessor: GP32
- Successor: GP2X Wiz

The GP2X was a Linux-based handheld video game console and portable media player developed by South Korean company GamePark Holdings. It was released on November 10, 2005, in South Korea only.

The GP2X was designed for homebrew developers as well as commercial developers. It is commonly used to run emulators for game consoles such as Neo Geo, Mega Drive/Genesis, Master System, Game Gear, Amstrad CPC, Commodore 64, NES, TurboGrafx-16, and MAME.

== Overview ==
The GP2X was designed to play music and videos, view photos, and play games. It had an open architecture (Linux based), allowing anybody to develop and run software. Also, there was the possibility for additional features (such as support for new media formats) to be added in the future due to the upgradeable firmware.

A popular use of the GP2X was to run emulators, which allows one to use software from a video game of another system on the GP2X.

== History ==
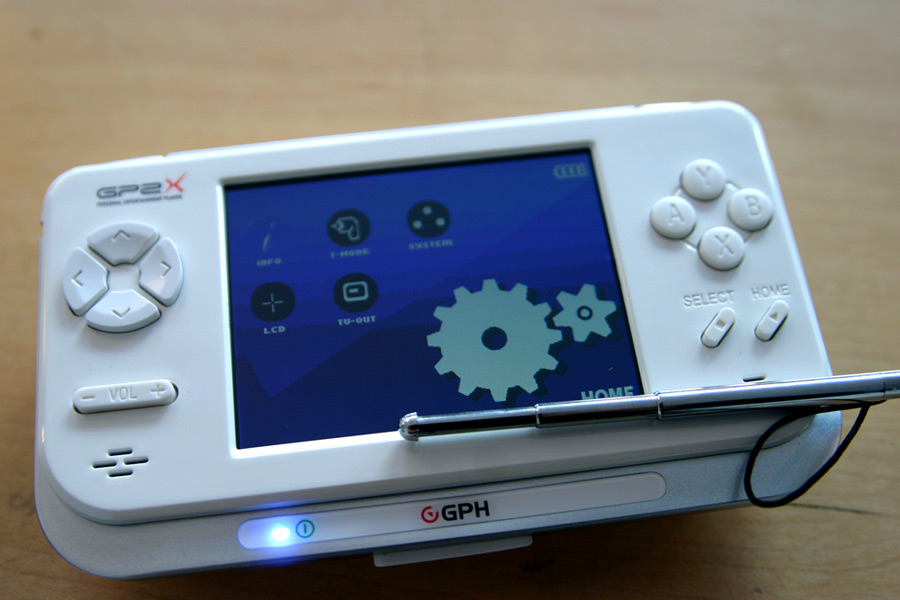
The newer model "F200" with touchscreen stylus

Shortly after the release of the GP32 in 2001, its maker Game Park began to design their next handheld. A disagreement within the company about the general direction of this system prompted many of the staff to leave and create their own company, GamePark Holdings, to produce a 2D-based handheld system which they saw as the sequel to the GP32.

GamePark Holdings spoke to previous GP32 distributors and developers to determine the specifications for the new machine and how it should be promoted. Meetings were held in Seoul, Korea, where the final design of the new console was agreed upon.

The first name of this console was the GPX2. However, it couldn't be used as a final name due to a possible trademark violation with the name of a Japanese printer, the GPX. A contest for a new name was announced on August 3, 2005. Around 1500 names were submitted in total. The winner of the competition was Matt Bakse who chose the title GP2X. For this he was awarded a free GP2X console, although delivery of his prize was rather delayed.

The GP2X has seen several minor hardware updates, most notably the changes from the First Edition to Normal Edition and the Normal Edition to the MK2. Also, a new version called the "F200" was released earlier than expected on October 30, 2007 and features a touchscreen, among other changes.

By August 23, 2006 the GP2X was available to buy through an online distributor in the United States of America.

As of October 16, 2006, the GP2X had sold 30,000 units. On August 31, 2008, the CEO of Gamepark Holdings told German GP2X distributor Michael Mrozek (aka. EvilDragon) that 60,000 GP2X units had been sold. The Korea Times reported in 2009 that over 60,000 GP2X units had been sold.

On 26 August 2008, GamePark Holdings announced the successor to the GP2X, the "Wiz".

As of September 1, 2008 a version of the GP2X is still being sold in Korea by Vocamaster that is geared toward Koreans who wish to learn English. In fact, according to the official GP2X distributor for the UK, Craig Rothwell, most GP2X units sold to date have been sold through Vocamaster as English-learning tools.

== Hardware ==
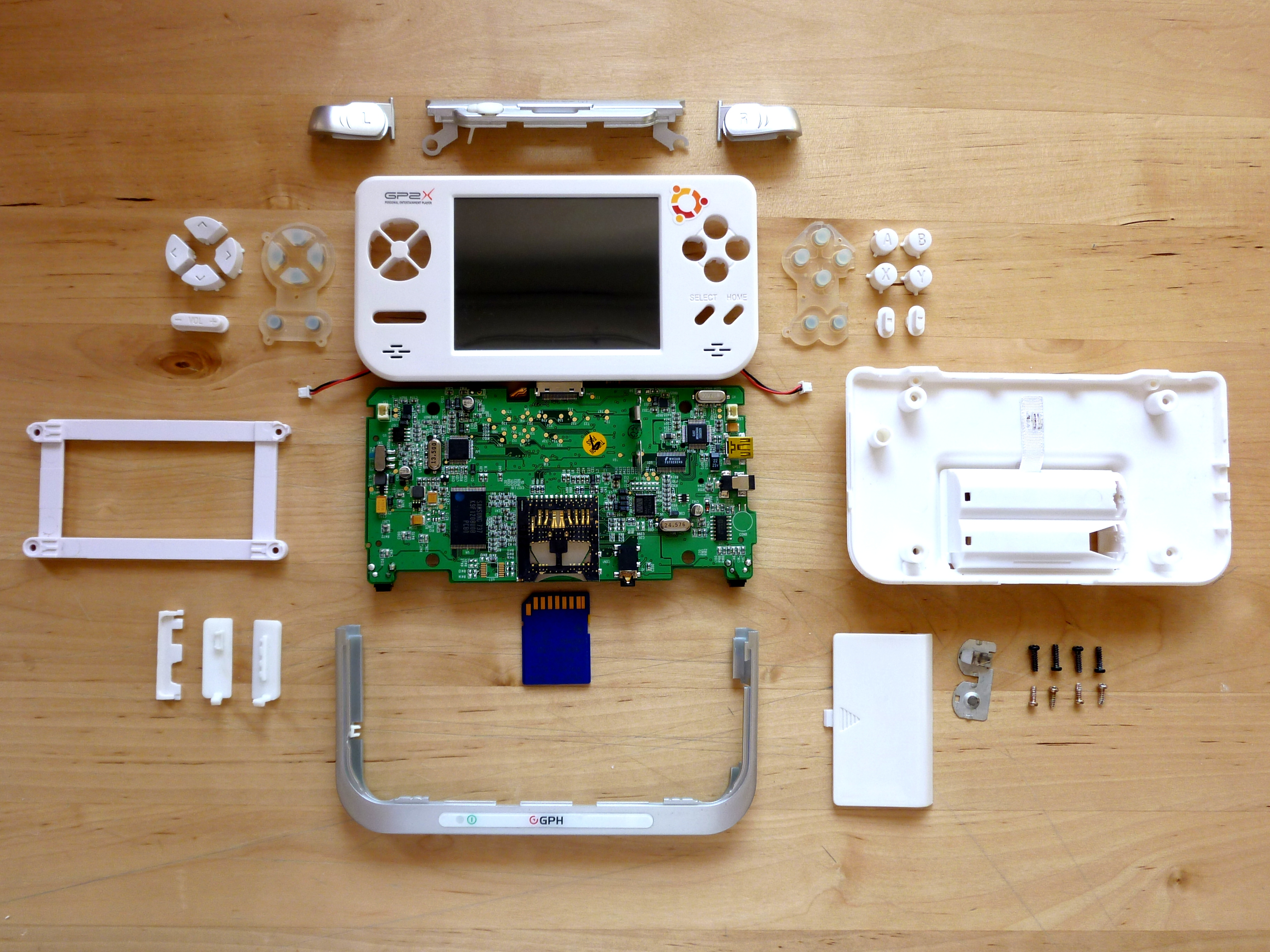
A disassembled GP2X F-200

=== Specifications ===
- Chipset: MagicEyes MMSP2 MP2520F System-on-a-chip
- CPU: 200 MHz ARM920T host processor, 200 MHz ARM940T programmable coprocessor
- NAND Flash ROM: 64 MB
- RAM: SDRAM 64 MB
- Operating System: Linux-based OS
- Storage: SD card (Latest firmware supports SDHC)
- Connection to PC: USB 2.0 High Speed
- USB Host: USB 1.1
- Power: 2 × AA battery or via AC adapter
- Display: 320×240 3.5 inch, 65,536 colors TFT LCD
- TV output
- Physical size: 143.6 mm wide, 82.9 mm high, 27 mm (excl. joystick approx.) / 34 mm deep
- Weight: 161 g (without battery)

The ARM940T was used by GPH's implementation of Linux to control video processing. Using the 940T core in Linux for other tasks apart from video processing is difficult but possible. Accessing the hardware directly makes it easier to use both CPUs.

The F-200 version of the GP2X hardware replaced the joystick with a directional pad and added a touchscreen.

=== Expandability ===
The GP2X had an expansion "EXT" port on the base of the unit into which a range of special cables (for USB host, TV-out via S-Video or Composite, etc.) or break out box could be plugged, allowing four USB devices to be connected to and used with the GP2X directly. The only thing limiting what can be used through this interface is the availability of drivers.

The connector used to expand the GP2X is hard to come by on its own but it is used with a few other devices. The Samsung e810/e730 and LG U8110/20/30/36/38 mobile telephone data cables, along with the official GP2X TV-Out adapter are suitable connectors.

This connector isn't proprietary; the specifications of this connector are fully open, encouraging home cable construction.

=== TV output ===
The GP2X also supported TV-out with a special cable that plugs into the EXT port. This allows videos that are normally scaled down to fit the GP2X's screen to be played at native resolution on a TV. It also lets software be displayed on the higher resolution TV rather than the screen. Not all software supports this natively, but 3rd party software exists that enables TV-out functionality in all applications. This is done by launching a background process.

=== Power ===
The GP2X requires 2 AA-sized batteries if not running from an external power supply. Due to the high current drain, standard alkaline batteries will not function for very long in the GP2X; NiMH or lithium batteries are recommended.

Battery life varies depending on the type of activity being performed and can last anywhere from 10 minutes (using alkaline batteries) to over 6 hours (using high-capacity NiMH batteries). When listening to music, power can be conserved by turning off the backlight and display.

The GP2X has a socket for an external power supply. It must be rated 3.3V DC at 1A with a standard center-grounded (negative center) connector. The power supply should be regulated, as voltage spikes can permanently damage the unit.

=== Storage ===
The GP2X's primary storage device is the Secure Digital card, which can be placed into a socket at the top of the unit. Older firmware only supported SD cards up to 4 GB in capacity. SD cards must be formatted as either FAT16, FAT32 (32 is more reliable), or ext2. The GP2X also has 64 MB of internal flash memory storage, of which 32MB can be used for user data.

From firmware release version 4.0 the GP2X F200 is capable of addressing the new SDHC standard and thus now works with SDHC cards up to 64GB in size.

=== Overclocking ===
The two ARM processors in the GP2X can be overclocked beyond their rated speed in software. The maximum speed one can reach through overclocking varies from system to system, with about 1 in 50 reaching over 300 MHz and others barely reaching 240 MHz (many systems can be overclocked beyond 240 MHz with no problems. The highest they are advertised to overclock to is 266 MHz.)

== Multimedia support ==
=== Video ===
- Video formats: DivX 3/4/5, Xvid (MPEG-4)
- Audio formats: MP3 and Vorbis
- Container files: AVI and OGM (WMA and MPG via additional software)
- Maximum Resolution: 720*480 (scaled to 320x240 screen resolution using built in scaling chip)
- Captions: SMI, SRT
- Battery Life: 3.5 hours average, longer times possible with high capacity batteries and with use of the power saving modes within.

=== Audio ===
- Audio Formats: MP3, Vorbis (more with alternative players)
- Channels: Stereo
- Frequency Range: 20 Hz - 20 kHz
- Power output: 100 mW
- Sample Resolution/Rate: 16bit/8–48 kHz
- Equalizer: includes "Normal", "Classic", "Rock", "Jazz", "Pop" presets
- Battery Life: ~6 hours (information given by manufacturer) with 2 x 2500mAh AA batteries.

== Software ==
Because the tools required for development on the GP2X are freely available, there is a wealth of software available for the GP2X, much of which is free. Types of software available includes emulators, games, PDA applications and multimedia players.

=== Built-in software ===
The GP2X has several pieces of software built directly into the firmware. There is a version of MPlayer which is used to play music and video, an image viewer, an e-book reader (which can display the contents of standard text documents on-screen) and a utility to adjust the LCD update frequency to eliminate any flickering.

Other applications available (though not accessible directly through the menu) were a Samba server, for transferring files to the machine using the default Windows network file sharing protocol; an HTTP server, for providing web pages; an FTP server, a different way of transferring files; and telnet access allowing for direct command line access from outside the machine. These servers operate over the included USB networking functionality, allowing one to connect the GP2X to a wider network through a PC. The new GP2X-F200 supports none of these network programs.

Version 3.0.0 of the firmware comes with 5 games pre-installed in the NAND memory. The games are Payback (demo), Noiz2sa, Flobopuyo, SuperTux, and Vektar (freeware version). This firmware is currently shipped with new GP2Xs.

=== Emulators ===
There are many emulators available for the GP2X which allow you to run software from other systems on the GP2X. Many emulators will run most software perfectly and at the intended speed, but some others may have various issues (often to do with speed or sound). Popular emulators include GnGeo which emulates the Neo Geo; GNUboy2x, Game Boy and Game Boy Color emulators; MAME, an emulator of various arcade machines; DrMD, which emulates the Master System, Game Gear and Mega Drive/Genesis; SquidgeSNES and PocketSNES, which emulate Super NES games; and Picodrive, which emulates Mega Drive and Sega CD games; psx4all which emulates PlayStation games. Stella, an emulator for the Atari 2600 has also been ported to the GP2X

=== Games ===
Since the GP2X has a much smaller following than other handheld consoles, such as the Sony PSP or the Nintendo DS, there are very few commercial games available for it. Vektar, Payback, Quartz², retrovirus RTS, Wind and Water: Puzzle Battles and Blazar have been released as commercial games for the GP2X, and the games Odonata and Elsewhere were released in October 2006 for Korean distribution only.

However, there are many ports of games from other platforms, mostly Linux, to the GP2X. Popular ports include SuperTux and Frozen Bubble as well as the Duke Nukem 3D, Quake, and Doom engines (which can run the original games if the user owns a copy with the correct data files). There are also hundreds of original freeware games such as Tilematch and Beat2X, made by GP2X programmers in their spare time.

=== Multimedia players ===
There are several unofficial multimedia players available for the GP2X, intended to support more formats than the built-in music and video players can handle. One such program is a port of FFPlay that allows you to play several RealMedia and Windows Media formats. Since the release of the MPlayer source code, several unofficial builds have been released for various purposes. One of these adds support for playing music in the AAC format.

=== Music Creation Tools ===
The GP2X natively runs the free homebrew application Little Game Park Tracker, a music tracker program which was created by chip musician M-.-n specifically for the GP2X. Little Game Park Tracker, also known as LGPT or Little Piggy Tracker, allows for sample-based music production with a myriad of sample tweaking abilities. LGPT borrows the interface of the popular Game Boy music tracker Little Sound DJ. It has since been ported to the PSP, Dingoo, Windows, OS X, and other platforms.

=== PDA Applications ===
Two popular PDA desktop environments have been ported to the GP2X: Qtopia and GPE. Both contain a range of programs such as a web browser, word processor, etc. and can be controlled with either the GP2X controls or a USB mouse and keyboard connected through a USB cable attached to the EXT port.

=== Open source development ===
SDKs (software development kits) are freely and easily available for the GP2X allowing anybody with the required skills to write an application or game. Most SDKs are based around a gcc cross-compiler toolchain and SDL. SDL is available for many systems, allowing for cross-compatibility of code with other platforms such as Microsoft Windows and GNU/Linux.

A port of the Allegro game programming library is also available for the GP2X, as are ports of the Fenix and BennuGD game toolkits.

Other libraries under development include Minimal Library SDK, which allows for direct hardware access inside the GP2X Linux environment, and sdk2x a set of libraries and a program which allows you to leave Linux completely for total control of all the hardware with no operating system to interfere.

Currently in development is gpu940, a soft 3D renderer that can do many rendering types, including true perspective texture mapping/lighting. It utilizes the ARM940T CPU of the GP2X, and allows for the GP2X to run basic OpenGL functions. In January 2007, the renderer's OpenGL functions allowed for the 3D roleplaying game Egoboo to be ported to the GP2X at a playable speed, and a month later updated with increased speed and added lighting effects.

=== GP2X executables ===
GP2X executable files have one of two 3 letters file extensions. For games, the .gpe extension is used. These are listed in the Games section of the menu. Utilities have the extension .gpu, and appear in the Utilities section of the menu; in firmware 3.0.0 they appear along with the games.

== See also ==
- Comparison of handheld game consoles
- GP32 - Predecessor device
- GP2X Wiz - Successor device
- GP2X Caanoo - Successor device
- Pandora (console), another open source handheld device
- List of other Linux-based, handheld gaming devices
