= Frozen Bubble =

2002 video game

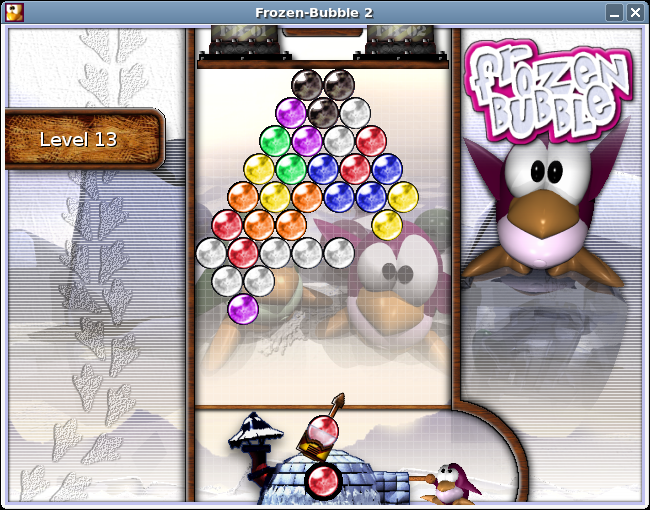
- Original authors: Guillaume Cottenceau (code); Alexis Younes (graphic); Matthias Le Bidan (music); Amaury Amblard-Ladurantie (graphic)
- Release: 0.9.2 / February 8, 2002; 24 years ago
- Stable release: 2.2.1 / 9 July 2010; 16 years ago
- Written in: Perl
- Platform: Linux, Windows (version 1.0.0 only), Mac OS X, Java, Symbian, gp2x, FreeBSD, NetBSD, Windows Phone 7, Android
- Type: Single, two, and multiplayer (2 to 5 players) puzzle game
- Website: https://web.archive.org/web/20230125113743/http://www.frozen-bubble.org/
- Repository: github.com/kthakore/frozen-bubble

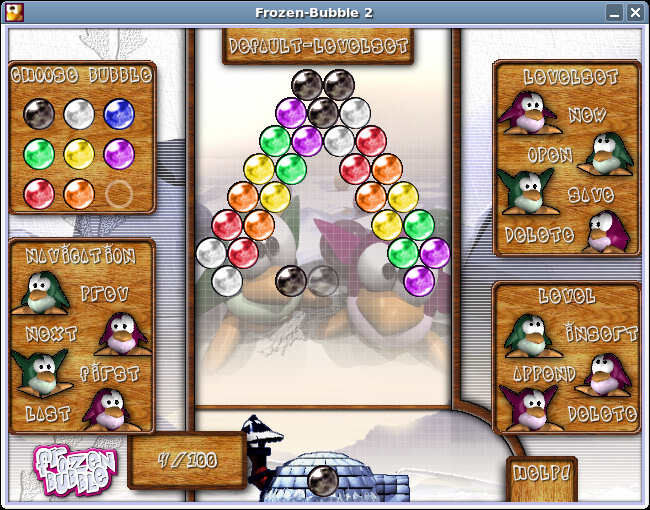
Integrated level editor of Frozen Bubble 2.x

Frozen Bubble is a free software clone of Puzzle Bobble for a variety of home and mobile systems.

== Gameplay ==
Frozen Bubble's protagonist is a penguin a la Tux, the mascot of Linux and popular feature in many free software/open-source games. In this game, Tux has to shoot colored frozen bubbles to form groups of the same color. Such groups disappear and the object is to clear the whole screen in this way before a bubble passes a line at the bottom. There is a single player mode and a multiplayer mode via Split screen, LAN and Internet. The game features 100 levels and includes a level editor.

== History ==
In 2001, Guillaume Cottenceau started writing the original Frozen Bubble game in Perl while using the Simple DirectMedia Layer (SDL) library. The music was made with FastTracker II by demoscener Matthias Le Bidan. Alexis Younes and Amaury Amblard-Ladurantie created the sprites and background graphic artwork with GIMP. The game is released under the GNU GPL-2.0-only. There is a version programmed in Perl and another one programmed in Java. The Perl-version runs on POSIX-compatible operating systems, e.g. Linux and the BSDs, while the Java-version runs on any operating system that supports Java.

The 2006 released version 2.0 introduced multiplayer play via LAN and Internet. Two players can also play on the same computer (split screen). The chain reaction mode (where fallen bubbles will zoom back up to complete triplets, possibly causing more bubbles to fall and thus creating more combos) is also available in network mode as of Version 2.0, and greatly changes the mechanics of the game. Version 2.0 introduced artwork rendered with Blender.

The Frozen Bubble Team provides builds only for Linux distributions, while ports to other Unix-like operating systems (such as Mac OS X and the BSDs), Windows and mobile phones exist from the community.

== Reception and impact ==
Linux For You ranked Frozen Bubble 5/5 in September 2009. Frozen Bubble was integrated in many Linux distributions and also ported to many platforms like macOS or PDAs. Frozen Bubble became also a quite popular free game which got distributed via several gaming outlets and aggregated significant download numbers over the years: chip.de counted 80,000, computerbild.de 93,000, Softpedia 18,000, and Softonic 350,000 downloads. It was also included on several cover disks of computer magazines, for instance MacAddict in February 2004 and Linux Format in March 2009.

=== Awards ===
- The Linux Game Tome's Best Free Game Award and Best Sound/Music Award in 2003.
- Linux Journal's Editors' Choice: Game in 2003.
- Linux Journal's Readers' Choice: Favorite Linux Game in 2003, 2004, 2005, 2008, 2009, and 2010.
- Linux Format's HotPick in February 2007.
- APC's honorable mention in their Top five free games in 2008.

== See also ==
- List of open source games
- Snood
