= GamePark Holdings =

South Korean electronics company

- Founded: 2005; South Korea
- Headquarters: South Korea

GPH, formerly known as GamePark Holdings, was a South Korean company responsible for creating the GP2X. It was founded by former employees of the game maker GamePark in 2005.

== History ==
Several years after the release of the GP32, its maker GamePark began to design their next handheld. A disagreement within the company about the general direction of this system prompted many of the staff (including the majority of engineers) to leave and create their own company, GamePark Holdings, to create, produce and market a 2D handheld system that they saw as the evolution of the GP32. In contrast, GamePark began developing the XGP, a 3D system similar to the PlayStation Portable. The XGP was never released and in March 2007, the old company filed for bankruptcy.

The name of the 2D console was conceived as the GPX2. Eventually, GPH would run into difficulty with it due to a possible trademark violation with the name of a Japanese printer, the GPX, being considered too similar. Potential confusion with a "second generation printer" needed to be avoided, so a contest for a new name was announced on August 3, 2005. Around 1500 names were submitted by the deadline of the 15th day, but trademark issues hindered the registration of the fifteen selected names. Eventually, GamePark Holdings simply decided to swap some letters and name their handheld GP2X, finding it an available trademark.

By the time it was discontinued in August 2008, 60,000 GP2X units had been sold. In May 2009, the GP2X Wiz was released, the successor to the GP2X.

In August 2010 GPH launched a new handheld console, Caanoo, as a successor to the GP2X Wiz, with games purchased through GPH's simultaneously released online app/game store called FunGP. The Caanoo failed to sell well.

In March 23, 2013, they discontinued their business service, and the post processing for the CAANOO consoles was proceeded by AR Plus.
