= Payback (video game) =

2001 video game

- Amiga cover art
- Developer: Apex Designs
- Publishers: Apex Designs (Amiga); DSI Games/Zoo Digital (GBA); Freeverse (Mac)
- Series: Payback
- Platforms: Amiga, WarpOS, Game Boy Advance, Macintosh, GP2X, iOS
- Release: Amiga; 2001; Game Boy Advance: PAL: 2004; GP2X: WW: 2006
- Genres: Action, Grand Theft Auto clone
- Modes: Single-player, multiplayer

Payback is a video game developed and published by Apex Designs. It was first released in 2001. It was followed by a sequel in 2012, Payback 2.

== Gameplay ==
Gameplay is similar to the original Grand Theft Auto, with new camera angles and more weapons being obvious differences. The player can use shotguns and grenades, as well as weapons such as remote-controlled cars carrying explosives.

The game also supports four-player multiplayer deathmatch.

The Game Boy Advance version includes eleven cities.

== Development ==
It was originally a fan's project to make an Amiga clone of Grand Theft Auto. In the author's own words, "every effort has been made to ensure that Payback beats GTA in every way."

The game was eventually expanded into a commercial release, and in 2002 Apex Designs announced plans to bring it to Microsoft Windows, Macintosh, and the Game Boy Advance (GBA). The Mac version was speedily released, but there is still no word on the Windows version's released date. A version for the GP2X handheld was released in 2006.

Despite the game being a clone of GTA, even copying car names such as the "Mundaneo", Rockstar has made no attempt to stop Apex Designs from publishing this game, or warn them about infringing on their copyrighted materials.

The GBA version was also finished, but Apex Designs couldn't initially find a publisher. After numerous failed attempts to get it published, it was not until late 2004 that DSI Games finally picked up the game. The GBA version received an age rating from North America's ESRB, however it didn't officially release there.

A sequel to Payback, Payback 2 for iOS and Android devices, was released on 4 October 2012

== Additional content ==
The Amiga version allowed fans to make their own deathmatch maps (see the link below). These cannot be added into the GBA version, but a slightly modified 'Isla Nublar' map is featured as an unlockable bonus.
