= Payback 2 =

2012 video game by Apex Designs

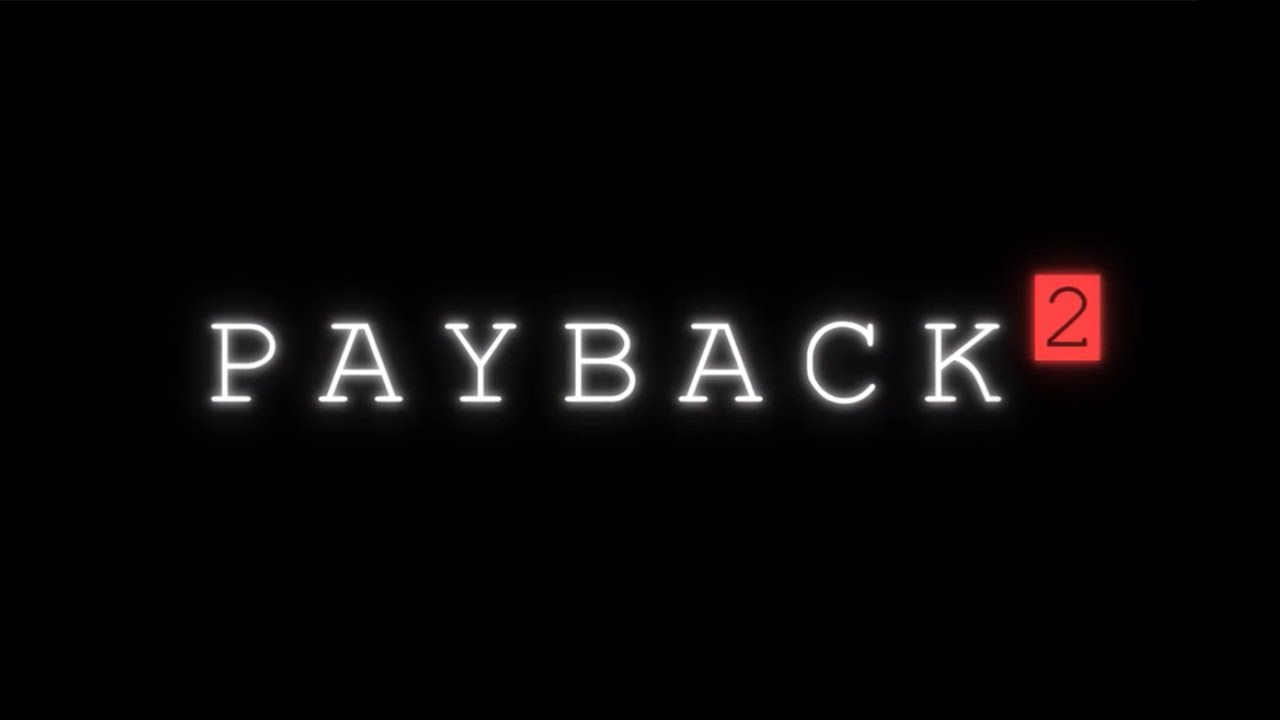
- Developer: Apex Designs Entertainment Ltd.
- Publisher: Apex Designs Entertainment Ltd.
- Programmer: James Daniels
- Series: Payback
- Platforms: Android, iOS
- Release: WW: 4 October 2012
- Genre: Action
- Modes: Single-player, multiplayer

Payback 2 is a 2012 mobile action video game developed and published by Apex Designs Entertainment Ltd. The sequel to the Grand Theft Auto-inspired 2001 game Payback, it was released on 4 October 2012 for iOS, became free-to-play in 2013, and was released for Android on 10 October 2014 via Google Play, where it is titled "Payback 2 - The Battle Sandbox".

Payback 2 is a 3D game with both single-player and online multiplayer gameplay, encompassing organised crime, violence, gang warfare, and racing. It is primarily a third-person shooter, racing game, and open-world game, with a variety of drivable vehicles and weapons. In the game's single-player story mode, the player participates in a criminal underworld by carrying out missions received by answering ringing payphones.

== Gameplay ==
=== Story mode ===
Payback 2 has a single-player "story" mode consisting of multiple chapters. The usual objective of each chapter is for the player to complete missions in order to earn enough money to complete the chapter, unlocking the next. The player receives a mission after answering a ringing payphone, where instructions from "the boss" are given via an accomplice. The mission instructions include criminal acts such as assassination, robbery, illegal racing, and clandestine deliveries. The player also earns money instantly from certain acts such as destroying vehicles and killing pedestrians. After committing crimes, the player must avoid being arrested or killed by the police, SWAT, or military.

=== Campaign mode ===
Payback 2's "campaign" mode consists of multiple "episodes", which are various types of solo or team events played with the AI characters. Some of these events include: "Brawl", the objective being kill the most opponents; "Gang Warfare", practically "Brawl" but with two teams; "Capture the Swag", a parody of the outdoor game Capture the Flag; "Conquest", where the two teams must occupy and defend multiple locations; "Kingpin", similar to "Conquest", but a free-for-all with only one zone at a time; "Race", where the player races against the AI characters in various vehicles around various routes in the different maps; "Sprint", practically "Race", but the routes are shorter; and "Knockout", like "Race", but the player in last place is eliminated on an interval.

=== Online multiplayer ===
Payback 2's online multiplayer mode lets players create and configure multiplayer versions of the event types mentioned above, that are hosted on one of the four proprietary game servers of choice. Once the first round finishes, the players can then vote between two randomly generated configurations for the next game. Private multiplayer matches are created in the same way, and the creator can share the four character long "shortcode", which is required to join, with whoever they want to play with. On completion of a public or private match, players earn an amount of "XP" depending on their result.

=== Music ===
Payback 2's startup cutscene has an accompanying soundtrack of Requiem Mass in D minor - Lacrimosa dies illa by Wolfgang Amadeus Mozart. No music other than this is featured in the game.

== Development ==
As the original Payback provided single-player gameplay only, Apex Designs developer James Daniels decided to emphasise multiplayer gameplay in Payback 2. The game uses a custom game engine.

In May 2015, Apex Designs released an update that dramatically improved the game's visuals. The original textures, which had been in use since the original Payback, were replaced with remastered versions. The lighting mechanics were also upgraded significantly.

In December 2016, Payback 2 received another major update, adding a proper and more realistic rigid-body physics system, improved gravity, vehicle models, character models, driving physics and more.

== Reception ==
Reception

Review score
Publication	Score
TouchArcade	3.5/5

Upon Payback 2's initial release, TouchArcade praised it for being a competent "Grand Theft Auto clone", but criticised its lack of a good story. Slide2Play would criticise the game, claiming that it "still has issues with its basic design. Winning a race is literally as easy as pushing forward... it's hard to target the (other) bad guys in the game's on-foot shooting mission... Shooting is also made difficult by the fact that everybody on-screen is tiny and seems to blend in with the dull environments." Several journalists noted having issues connecting, or finding, people to play with online as well.
