= GP2X Wiz =

Handheld game console by GamePark Holdings

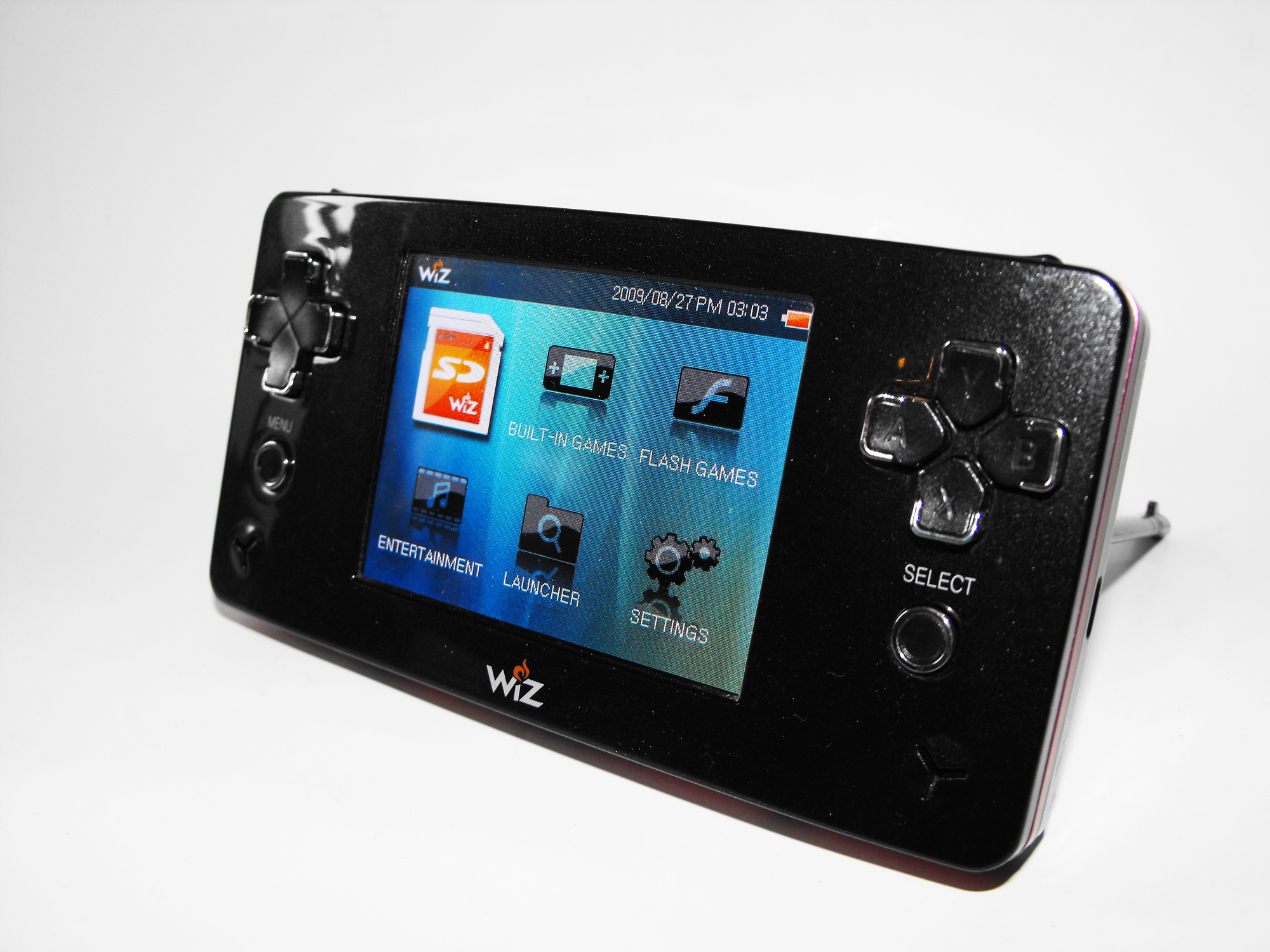
- A GP2X Wiz with the main menu open
- Manufacturer: GamePark Holdings
- Type: Handheld game console
- Generation: Seventh generation era
- Released: May 13, 2009
- Introductory price: $179.99
- Media: SD card
- Operating system: Linux based
- System on a chip: MagicEyes Pollux VR3520F
- CPU: ARM926EJ @ 533 MHz
- Memory: 64MB (DDR SDRAM)
- Storage: 1GB NAND Flash
- Removable storage: SDHC card
- Sound: Cirrus Logic 43L22
- Predecessor: GP2X
- Successor: Caanoo

The GP2X Wiz is a handheld game console and portable media player developed by South Korean company GamePark Holdings running a Linux kernel-based embedded operating system.

GP2X Wiz was released in May 2009, and was the first console from both Game Park and Game Park Holdings to also be released outside South Korea. It was announced by GamePark Holdings in August 2008, and succeeded the GP2X, featuring a slimmer profile and enhanced capabilities including a 533 MHz CPU (overclockable to 900 MHz), 1 GB NAND flash memory, 64 MB RAM, and a 2.8-inch AMOLED touchscreen. Distinguished from its predecessor by a more consistent release of games and a focus on both commercial and homebrew development, the Wiz targeted the open-source community. It supports various multimedia formats and comes with pre-installed games and applications, with an online application store launched in August 2009. Official accessories and the introduction of Flash Player 8 enhanced its appeal.

== History ==
An image of the Wiz system was first leaked on the web in late July 2008. Rumors had been circulating that GamePark Holdings was in the process of making a new handheld, since they had abruptly discontinued production of its first handheld, the GP2X, in late June/early July. Prior to the official announcement, this handheld was sometimes referred to as the GP3X.

On August 26, 2008, GamePark Holdings announced that it was planning to release a new handheld, named the Wiz. Along with the announcement, a brochure detailing a great amount of launch information was released, complete with the system's specs. The brochure stated that new games would be released every month for the system; This is a deviation from the GP2X, which did not have many commercial games. However, the Wiz still appears to be primarily advertised as an open-source system, meant for homebrew development of games and emulators.

On September 2, 2008, it was reported that the GP2X Wiz's button layout was to be revised, and the second D-Pad on the right-hand side of the system was to be removed. In order to make these design changes, the release of the system was to be pushed back to November 2008.

Around the last week of April 2009, GamePark shipped test units of the GP2X Wiz. These are thought to be the final hardware revision before the actual product launch.

Retailers for the GP2X Wiz stated that they planned to begin shipping the GP2X Wiz as soon as October 8, 2008. As of May 2009, retailers are listing the price of the Wiz at US$179.99. The GP2X Wiz started shipping as of May 13, 2009.

An online application store was set to launch in August of 2009.

Official accessories for the GP2X Wiz include the Accessory Kit (which comes with an SD card case, a wrist strap, and a spare stylus), a screen protector, and a Genuine Leather Case.

The successor of GP2X Wiz is GP2X Caanoo.

== Myungtendo ==
In February 2009, South Korean president Lee Myung-bak had stated that "Korea needs to develop a video game console like a Nintendo DS". This statement was parodied with the "Myungtendo MB", an obvious rip-off of the Nintendo DS. While completely unrelated to the Myungtendo incident, the GP2X Wiz is often nicknamed as the "Myungtendo", due to its release shortly after the statement.

== Hardware ==
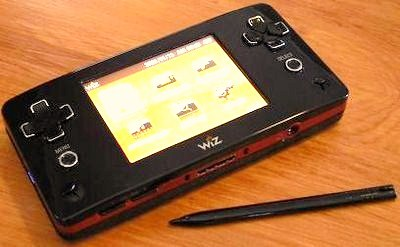
The GP2X Wiz has a slim profile compared to the earlier GP2X.

=== Specifications ===
- Chipset: MagicEyes Pollux System-on-a-Chip VR3520F
- CPU: 533 MHz ARM926TEJ (overclockable to 900 MHz, however the system can become unstable over 750 MHz)
- NAND Flash Memory: 1 GB
- RAM: 64 MB of DDR SDRAM
- Operating System: Linux-based OS
- Storage: SD card (SDHC support)
- Connection to PC: USB 2.0 High Speed
- USB Host: USB 1.1
- Power: Internal 2000mAh Lithium Polymer Battery (approx. 7 hours game/video playback)
- Display: 320x240 2.8-inch (71 mm) AMOLED Touch Screen
- Stereo audio DAC: Cirrus Logic 43L22
- Embedded Microphone
- Physical size: 121 by 61 by 18 millimetres (4.76 in × 2.40 in × 0.71 in)
- Weight: 98 g (without battery), 136 g (with battery)
- 3D Acceleration (GPU embedded on Pollux)
- Chipset supports OpenGL ES 1.1
- 133M Texel/sec, 1.33M Polygon/sec.

Based on the specs released by GamePark Holdings, the Wiz appears to have a considerably more slim and compact form factor than that of the GP2X. The Wiz also has a fairly large amount of built in flash memory, which GamePark has stated will be used to hold games that will be included with the system. OLED screens have much better contrast ratios than LCD screens, particularly because, unlike LCDs, they can display true black.

== Multimedia support ==
=== Video ===
- Container files: AVI
- Video formats: DivX, XviD, MPEG4, AVI and others via software: flv, mp4, mkv...
- Audio formats: MP3, WAV and others via software.
- Maximum Resolution: 640*480
- Maximum Frame Rate: 30 frame/s
- Maximum Video Bitrate: 2500 kbit/s
- Maximum Audio Bitrate: 384 kbit/s
- Captions: SMI

=== Audio ===
- Audio formats: MP3, Ogg Vorbis, WAV (more via software)
- Channels: Stereo
- Frequency Range: 20 Hz - 20 kHz
- Power output: 100 mW
- Sample Resolution/Rate: 16bit/8–48 kHz, in 8bit/22 kHz

=== Photos ===
- Supports JPG, PNG, GIF, BMP File Formats (more via software)

=== Flash Player ===
The system was initially supposed to ship with Flash Player 7. The Wiz also has Flash Player 8 with ActionScript 2.0 support, allowing it to play flash games from the Internet.

== Games ==
The Wiz had only four commercial retail games, these are:

- Deicide 3: Distorted Existence
- Propis
- Redemption: Liar
- Rhythmos

The Wiz can run many emulators, freeware games, flash games, and applications. The GP2X Wiz comes pre-installed with a number of games on the NAND.

IQ Jump

This is a collection of 5 brain training style games.
- Look for the same pictures
- Look for the missing number
- Addition and Subtraction
- Look for the coin in the saving pocket
- Crisis Ladder

- Animatch by Ruckage
- Square Tower Defence by Alex
- Wiztern by Chemaris
- Myriad by Clare Jonsson
- Tail Tale by Rerofumi
- Boomshine2x by Peter Roberts
- Space Varments by Ruckage

Originally a game called Snake on Dope was shipped with the unit, and may have been removed due to copyright issues relating to the music.

== See also ==
- Comparison of handheld game consoles
- GP32 - Predecessor device
- Pandora (console), an open source handheld device
