= Caanoo =

Handheld game console

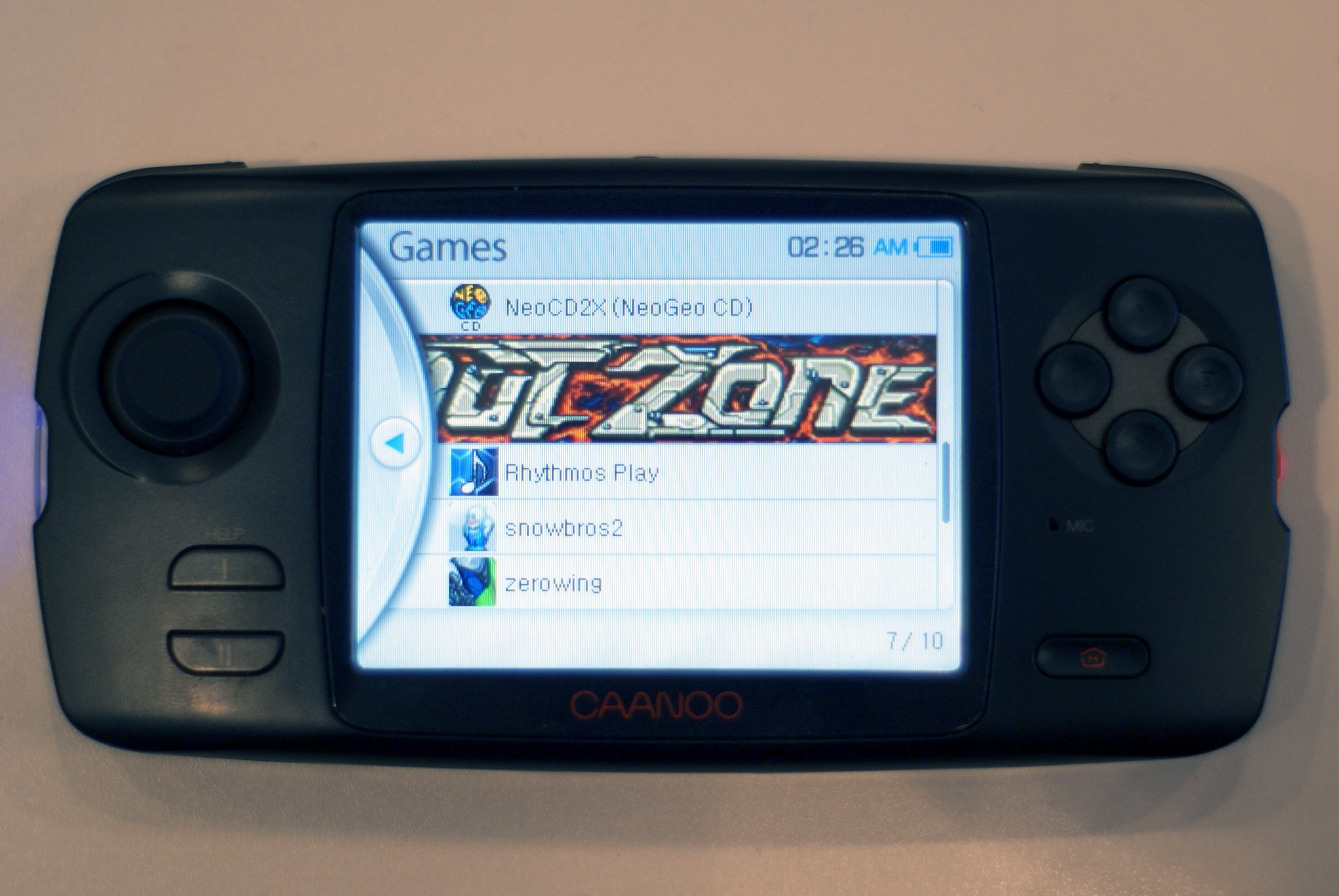
- Manufacturer: GamePark Holdings
- Type: Handheld game console
- Released: SK|EU: August 16, 2010
- Introductory price: $150
- Discontinued: September 2011
- Media: SD / SDHC card
- Operating system: Linux-based
- System on a chip: MagicEyes Pollux VR3520F
- CPU: 533 MHz Host ARM9
- Memory: 128 MB (SDRAM)
- Graphics: 3D capable
- Sound: Wolfson Microelectronics WM1800
- Predecessor: GP2X Wiz

The GP2X Caanoo, more commonly known as Caanoo, stylized CAANOO, is an open source, Linux-based handheld video game console and portable media player developed by the South Korean company GamePark Holdings. It was released on August 16, 2010, in South Korea and was also sold throughout Europe. It is the successor to the GP2X Wiz, and was showcased at the Electronic Entertainment Expo 2010. The device's launch price was about US$150, but did not reach any retail stores in North America.

The Caanoo is not a direct competitor of handheld consoles like Nintendo DS or PlayStation Portable, but rather an alternative open source device. Because of that, any software that is compatible can be run without the need to create custom firmware or other homebrew applications. This is the last open-source gaming device by GamePark Holdings, as they ceased production and development of gaming hardware to focus solely on software.

== Applications ==
The Caanoo had only four commercial retail games: Asura Cross, Propis, Rhythmos, and Wiz Party.

The Caanoo can run several applications that emulate consoles or computer systems, such as DrPocketSnes for the Super NES, GnGEO for the Neo-Geo, Hu-Go for the PC Engine/TurboGrafx-16, PCSX ReArmed for original PlayStation games, MAME4all for arcade games and Picodrive for the Mega Drive/Sega Genesis and its add-ons, as well as freeware homebrew games/applications. These applications are created by the community itself and not by the manufacturers. Most software can be found at OpenHandhelds, a community-driven website.

Gamepark Holdings also had a website focused on downloadable content named FunGP. It sold commercial Caanoo and Wiz games, as well as some retro Arcade games. It has since ceased operations.

Caanoo is not compatible with software built for previous GPH devices (such as the GP2X Wiz) without an application to allow it to do so. A compatibility layer named Ginge allows for most software to be compatible, and most applications have already been ported.

== See also ==
- Comparison of handheld game consoles
- GP2X F100/F200 – predecessor device
- GP2X Wiz – predecessor device
- Dingoo – handheld gaming console
- Pandora (console) – open-source handheld device
- GCW Zero
