= List of commercial GP32 games =

This is a list of commercial games for the GP32 handheld game console, which was primarily known for homebrew and emulators.

Most commercial GP32 games could be bought in two ways: boxed or downloaded through the internet through Gamepark's online JoyGP store (typically for a much lower price). Although most games were sold in both formats, there were a few exceptions: for example, Blue Angelo was (and is still being) only sold as a boxed copy made in France, and Gloop Deluxe was only sold online, but not through JoyGP.

Only 28 games were released.

This list does not include those commercial games which can be played on the console with the use of interpreters. All such interpreters may be found at the OpenHandhelds Archive.

Title	Developer	Publisher	Genre	Date
Astonishia Story R	Sonnori	Gamepark	RPG	January 21, 2002
Blue Angelo	Virtual Spaghetti	Shibuya Interactive	Platformer/RPG	December 16, 2004
Dooly Soccer 2002	Abyss Game	Gamepark	Sport	June 18, 2002
Dungeon & Guarder	Gamepark	Gamepark	Hack 'n Slash	November 23, 2001
Dyhard - with Infinite Stairs aka. Dyhard Infinity	Kookie Soft	Gamepark	Action	November 23, 2001
Funny Soccer	Metarica	Gamepark	Action	November 2002
Gloop Deluxe	Aeon Flame	Aeon Flame	Puzzle	November 20, 2003
GP Fight	TeamBlaze	Gamepark	Action/Mini-games	March 21, 2003
Hany Party Game	Include	Gamepark	Puzzle	June 26, 2002
Her Knights a.k.a. Her Knights: Forcing Break-Out a.k.a. All For Princess: Deadline	Byulbram	Gamepark	Arcade	April 19, 2002
Kimchi-Man	Spearhead	Gamepark	Platformer	February 2002
Little Wizard	Gamepark	Gamepark	Fighting	November 23, 2001
Mill	Article Seezak	Gamepark	Action RPG	2003
Oneshot Voca	Damasys	Gamepark	Educational	October 2002
Pinball Dreams	Logik State	Gamepark	Pinball	October 2002
Princess Maker 2	Ninelives	Gamepark	Simulation	August 8, 2002
Rally Pop	Gamepark	Gamepark	Strategy	November 23, 2001
Raphael	T3 Entertainment	Gamepark	Puzzle	September 9, 2002
Story of Bug Eyed Monster	Article Seezak	Gamepark	Visual Novel	September 9, 2003
Super Plusha	FaMe Soft	Gamepark	Platformer	October 17, 2002
Tanggle's Magic Square	EZ	Gamepark	Puzzle	November 23, 2001
Tears: Contact	Team DTR	Gamepark	Visual Novel	2003
Therapy	Rosa:6	Gamepark	Visual Novel	March 23, 2002
Tomak: Save the Earth, Again!	Seed9	Gamepark	Shooter	February 2002
Treasure Island	Gamepark	Gamepark	Puzzle	January 21, 2002
Wanna Be Wizard	A&B Soft	Gamepark	RPG	October 27, 2004
Winter Is...	Rosa:6	Gamepark	Visual Novel	April 4, 2003
Wizard Slayer	FZ Media	Gamepark	Shooter	October 11, 2002

== References/external links ==
- Roundup and reviews of most commercial GP32 games on Insert Credit
- More complete roundup at GP32newbie
