= Sixth generation of video game consoles =

Gaming generation from 1998 to 2013

In the history of video games, the sixth generation era (in rare occasions called the 128-bit era; see "bits and system power" below) is the era of computer and video games, video game consoles, and handheld gaming devices available at the turn of the 21st century, starting on November 27, 1998. Platforms in the sixth generation include consoles from four companies: Sega's Dreamcast (DC), Sony's PlayStation 2 (PS2), the Nintendo GameCube (GC), and Microsoft's Xbox. This era began on November 27, 1998, with the release of the Dreamcast, followed by the PlayStation 2 on March 4, 2000, the GameCube on September 14, 2001, and the Xbox on November 15, 2001. The Dreamcast was among the first to be discontinued in 2001, followed by Xbox in 2006, GameCube in 2007, and PlayStation 2 in 2013. Meanwhile, the seventh generation of consoles started on November 22, 2005, with the launch of the Xbox 360.

The major innovation of this generation was of full utilization of the internet to allow a fully online gaming experience. While the prior generation had some systems with internet connectivity, such as the Apple Pippin, these had little market penetration and thus had limited success in the area. Services such as Microsoft's Xbox Live became industry standard in this, and future, generations. Other innovations of the Xbox was its being the first system with an internal ethernet port and the first to utilize an internal hard disk drive to store game data. This led to many improvements to the gaming experience, including the ability to store program data (rather than just save game data) that allowed for faster load times, as well as the ability to download games directly from the internet rather than to purchase physical media such as a disk or cartridge. Soon after its release other systems, like the Sony PlayStation 2, produced peripheral storage devices to allow similar capabilities, and by the next generation internal storage became industry standard.

Bit ratings (i.e. "64-bit" or "32-bit" for the previous generation) for most consoles largely fell by the wayside during this era, with the notable exceptions being promotions for the Dreamcast and PS2 that advertised "128-bit graphics" at the start of the generation. The number of "bits" cited in this way in console names refers to the CPU word size, and had been used by hardware marketing departments as a "show of power" for many years. However, there is little to be gained from increasing the word size much beyond 32 or 64 bits because, once this level is reached, performance depends on more varied factors, such as processor clock speed, bandwidth, and memory size.

The sixth generation of handhelds began with the release of Bandai's WonderSwan, launched in Japan on March 4, 1999. Nintendo maintained its dominant share of the handheld market with the release of the Game Boy Advance on March 21, 2001, which featured many upgrades and new features over the Game Boy. The Game Boy Advance was discontinued in 2010. The next generation of handheld consoles began on November 21, 2004, with the North American release of the Nintendo DS.

The last official Dreamcast games were released in 2002 (North America and Europe) and 2007 (Japan). The last GameCube games were released in 2006 (Japan) and 2007 (North America and Europe). The last Xbox games were released in 2006 (Japan), 2007 (Europe) and 2008 (North America). The last PlayStation 2 games were released in 2013; The last game released in Japan was Final Fantasy XI: Seekers of Adoulin in March, the last game released in North America was FIFA 14 in September, and last game released in Europe was Pro Evolution Soccer 2014 in November, marking the end of this generation.

== Home systems ==
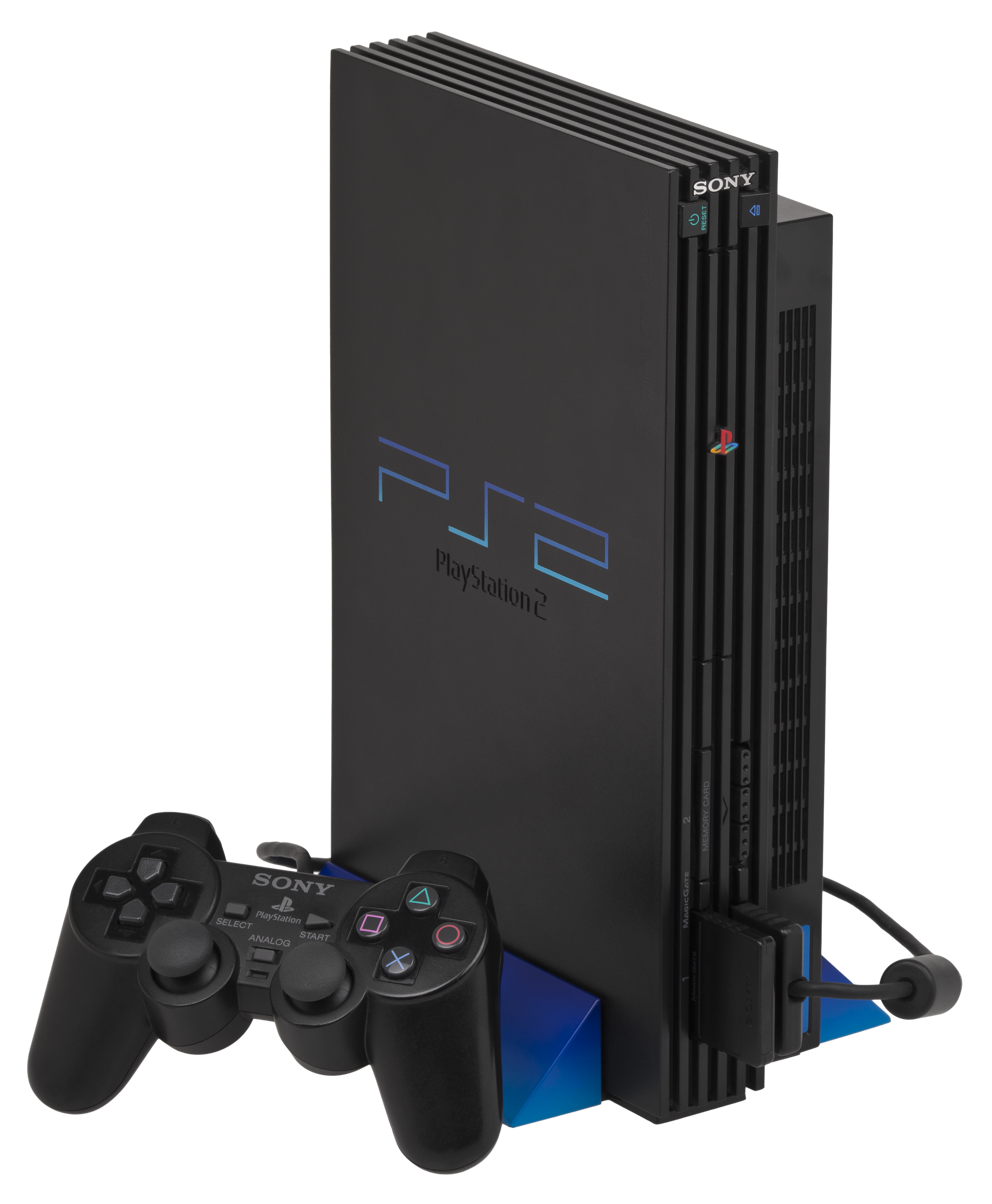
The PlayStation 2 was the best-selling system of the sixth generation, selling over 160 million units, also making it the best-selling console of all time.

The PlayStation 2 achieved sales dominance in this generation, becoming the best-selling console in history, with over 160 million units sold as of November 2024. The Microsoft Xbox had sold over 24 million units as of May 2006, and the GameCube had sold 21.74 million units as of September 2010. The Dreamcast, which arrived prior to all of the others and was discontinued in 2001, came in fourth with 9.13 million sold.

The sixth generation began to end when the Xbox was succeeded by the Xbox 360 in late 2005. GameCube hardware was still being produced when the Wii was released in late 2006, but as of February 2007 had also been ceased. PlayStation 2 sales continued to be strong through to the end of 2010, due to the system's large software library, continuing software support, and affordable price.

In February 2008, the PlayStation 2 outsold both the PlayStation 3 and Xbox 360 in the United States. Games were still being produced for the PlayStation 2, Xbox, and GameCube as of 2008, while Dreamcast games were officially discontinued in 2003. There were still a few games being produced for the Dreamcast in 2004, but they are essentially NAOMI arcade ports released only in Japan, with small print runs. The PlayStation 2 was still being produced after the launch of the Wii U in 2012, making the sixth generation the second longest generation of all time.

=== Dreamcast ===
Sega's Dreamcast was the first console of the generation and had several features to show an advantage from the competition, including Internet gaming as an optional feature through its built-in modem, and a web browser.

The console is credited with restoring Sega's reputation, which had been damaged by the earlier failures of the Sega Saturn, Sega 32X, Genesis Nomad and Sega CD. Despite this, the Dreamcast was discontinued prematurely due to numerous factors. The impending and much-hyped PlayStation 2 slowed Dreamcast sales, mostly due to the fact that the PlayStation 2 had a built-in DVD player and a huge number of PS1 owners looking to upgrade to the new, backward compatible console. In addition, Sega's short-lived support/success of its post-Mega Drive products the Mega-CD, 32X and Saturn had left developers and customers skeptical, with some holding out to see whether the Dreamcast or PlayStation 2 would come out on top.

Sega's decision to implement a GD-ROM (though publicly advertised as a CD-ROM) for storage medium did save costs but it did not compare well against the PS2's much-touted DVD capabilities. Sega was either unable or unwilling to spend the advertising money necessary to compete with Sony, who themselves took massive losses on the PlayStation 2 to gain market share. With the announcements of the Xbox and GameCube in late 2000, Sega's console was considered by some to be outdated only two years after its release. The previous losses from the Saturn, 32X, and Sega/Mega-CD, stagnation of sales due to the PlayStation 2, and impending competition from Microsoft and Nintendo caused Sega's revenue to shrink and announce their intention on killing the system in early 2001, dropping the system entirely and leaving the console market in early 2004 in Japan and much earlier in other countries. Sega also announced it would shut down SegaNet, an online gaming community that supported online-capable Dreamcast titles. Due to user outcry over the decision, Sega delayed the service's closure by an additional 6 months. Since the Dreamcast's discontinuation, Sega transitioned to software developing making games as a third-party company.

=== PlayStation 2 ===
The brand Sony had established with the original PlayStation was a major factor in the PlayStation 2's dominance, both in terms of securing a consumer base and attracting third-party developers, with the gradual increase in one reinforcing the other. The PlayStation 2 was also able to play DVDs and was backward compatible with PlayStation games, which many say helped the former's sales. Sony Computer Entertainment secured licensing for key games such as Final Fantasy X, Grand Theft Auto III, and Metal Gear Solid 2: Sons of Liberty, enabling the PS2 to outperform its competitors' launches. The console ended up becoming the top-selling console of this generation, while its competing consoles, the Xbox and the GameCube, went on to be modestly successful consoles.

=== GameCube ===
Nintendo struggled with conflicting brand images, particularly the family-friendly one developed during the 1990s. Its arsenal of franchises and history in the industry, though earning it a loyal fan base, failed to give it an advantage against the Xbox and PlayStation 2 which captured audiences seeking 'Mature' titles of which Nintendo had fewer. Nintendo also made little headway into online gaming (releasing a small handful of online-capable games, the most popular of which was Phantasy Star Online Episode I and II, which was an enhanced port of the Dreamcast game with various new features and content), instead emphasizing Game Boy Advance connectivity. As a result, the GameCube failed to match the sales of its predecessor, the Nintendo 64, but the console wasn't a financial failure. Nintendo did however rejuvenate its relationship with many developers, often working in close collaboration with them to produce games based upon its franchises, in contrast to the past where it was frequently seen as bullying developers in the late 1980s, back when the Nintendo Entertainment System was out on the market. As a result, the GameCube had more first and second party releases than its competitors, whose most successful titles were mainly products of third-party developers.

=== Xbox ===
Although the Xbox had the formidable financial backing of Microsoft, it was unable to significantly threaten the dominance of the PlayStation 2 as market leader. However, the Xbox attracted a large fanbase and strong third-party support in the United States and Europe and became a recognizable brand amongst the mainstream. The Xbox Live online service with its centralized model proved particularly successful, prompting Sony to boost the online capabilities of the PlayStation 2. Xbox Live also gave the Xbox an edge over the GameCube, which had a near-total lack of online games. The flagship of Xbox Live was the game Halo 2, which was the best-selling Xbox game with over 8 million copies sold worldwide. However, the Xbox failed to gain a following in Japan, with reasons cited including lack of brand recognition, lack of commitment to the console from Japanese publishers and developers, failure of Microsoft staff to fully understand important cultural differences, and ethnocentric preferences of the Japanese public for native products.

=== Comparison ===
Comparison of sixth-generation video game home consoles
Name		Dreamcast	PlayStation 2	GameCube	Xbox
Logo					
Manufacturer		Sega	Sony Computer Entertainment	Nintendo	Microsoft
Image(s)		Dreamcast console and controller with VMU.	Original (left) and Slimline (right) PS2 consoles	Indigo GameCube and controller	Xbox console with "Controller S"
Image(s)		Dreamcast and controller with VMU	Left: Original PlayStation 2 Right: Slimline PlayStation 2 with DualShock 2 controller	GameCube and controller	Xbox and controllers
Release date		JP: November 27, 1998; NA: September 9, 1999; EU: September 23, 1999; AU: October 14, 1999	JP: March 4, 2000; NA: October 26, 2000; EU: November 24, 2000; AU: November 30, 2000	JP: September 14, 2001; NA: November 18, 2001; EU: May 3, 2002; AU: May 17, 2002	NA: November 15, 2001; JP: February 22, 2002; EU: March 14, 2002; AU: March 14, 2002
Launch prices	US$	US$199.99 (equivalent to $390 in 2025)	US$299.99 (equivalent to $560 in 2025)	US$199.99 (equivalent to $360 in 2025)	US$299.99 (equivalent to $550 in 2025)
Launch prices	€	DEM499.99 (Equivalent to €255.64 in 1999 or €420 in 2023)	DEM869.99 (Equivalent to €444.31 in 2000 or €720 in 2023)	€199.99 (equivalent to €320 in 2023)	€479.99 (Changed to €399.99 shortly before Launch and equivalent to €620 in 2023)
Launch prices	GBP	£199.99 (equivalent to £380 in 2025)	£299.99 (equivalent to £570 in 2025)	£129.99 (equivalent to £240 in 2025)	£299.99 (equivalent to £560 in 2025)
Launch prices	A$				
Launch prices	JP¥	¥29,000 (equivalent to ¥31,990 in 2024)	¥39,800 (equivalent to ¥44,330 in 2024)	¥25,000 (equivalent to ¥28,070 in 2024)	¥34,800 (equivalent to ¥39,420 in 2024)
Discontinued		WW: March 31, 2001	JP: December 28, 2012; WW: January 4, 2013	WW: February 2007	JP: 2005; WW: 2006
Media	Type	GD-ROM, CD	DVD, CD	GameCube Game Disc (Note: Panasonic Q models: DVD)	DVD, CD
Media	Regional lockout	Region locked	Region locked	Region locked	Region locked
Media	Backward compatibility	None	PlayStation	Game Boy family (with Game Boy Player) (Note: The Game Boy Player, released in 2003, adds Game Boy Advance functionality to a GameCube. It is also backward compatible with Game Boy and Game Boy Color games. A few titles are not supported. The Game Boy Player was sold separately upon its launch, but it was later included with select GameCube bundles.)	None
Best-selling game		Sonic Adventure, 2.5 million (as of June 2006)	Grand Theft Auto: San Andreas, 20.81 million (as of August 24, 2013)	Super Smash Bros. Melee, 7.5 million (as of August 24, 2013)	Halo 2, 8.49 million (as of August 24, 2013)
Accessories (retail)		VMU; Dreamcast mouse and keyboard; Fishing Rod; Microphone; Light gun; Dreameye camera; Samba de Amigo Maracas (controller); More...	PlayStation 2 HDD Internal hard drive supported by PlayStation 2 Expansion Bay (models 30000 and 50000 only); Network adapter Built-in on slimline models (PSTwo, model 70000 onwards); EyeToy; PlayStation 2 DVD remote control; Guitar controllers; More...	WaveBird; GameCube – GBA link cable; GameCube Broadband Adapter and Modem Adapter; Game Boy Player; DK Bongos; Dance pad; GameCube Microphone; More...	Xbox Live Starter Kit; Xbox Media Center Extender; DVD Playback Kit; Xbox Music Mixer; Memory Unit (8 MB); Logitech Wireless Controller (2.4 GHz); More...
CPU		200 MHz SuperH SH-4	294 MHz MIPS "Emotion Engine" 299 MHz later models	485 MHz PowerPC "Gekko"	733 MHz x86 Intel Celeron/Pentium III Custom Hybrid
GPU		100 MHz NEC/VideoLogic PowerVR CLX2 "Holly"	147 MHz "Graphics Synthesizer"	162 MHz ATI "Flipper"	233 MHz Custom Nvidia NV2A
RAM		Main RAM 16 MB SDRAM; Video RAM 8 MB; Sound RAM 2 MB	Main RAM 32 MB dual-channel, RDRAM; Video RAM 4 MB eDRAM; Sound RAM 2 MB	Main RAM 24 MB 1T-SRAM, Video RAM 3 MB embedded 1T-SRAM; Audio/Alternative RAM 16 MB DRAM	64 MB unified DDR SDRAM
Audio		Stereo audio, with: 64 PCM/ADPCM channels; 128 step DSP; Yamaha XG MIDI support; Optional Dolby Surround support	5.1 ch. surround sound audio, with: 48 ADPCM channels; Software-mixed audio; Dolby Pro Logic II; Dolby Digital (for full motion video only); DTS	Stereo audio, with: 64 ADPCM channels; Optional use of Dolby Pro Logic II	5.1 ch. surround sound audio, with: 64 channels of 3D sound, or 256 channels of 16-bit stereo audio; Also supports MIDI, mono audio, Dolby Surround and Dolby Digital Live 5.1 in games; DTS support when playing back DVD movies only
Video outputs		VGA (RGBHV), SCART (RGBS), S-Video, composite	Component (YP_{B}P_{R}, RGsB), VGA (RGsB; progressive scan games/PS2 Linux only), SCART (RGBS), S-Video, composite	Component (YC_{B}C_{R}), SCART (RGBS; PAL consoles only), S-Video (NTSC consoles only), composite	Component (YP_{B}P_{R}), SCART (RGBS), S-Video, composite
Online service		JP: Dricas (1998–2007); NA: Sega Net (2000–2002); EU: Dreamarena (2000–2003)	Non-unified services (2002–2016)	Non-unified services (2003–2009)	Xbox Live (2002–2010)
System software		Proprietary OS, Windows CE	Proprietary OS, PS2 Linux	Proprietary OS	Proprietary OS, Xbox Windows Media Center

=== Worldwide sales standings ===
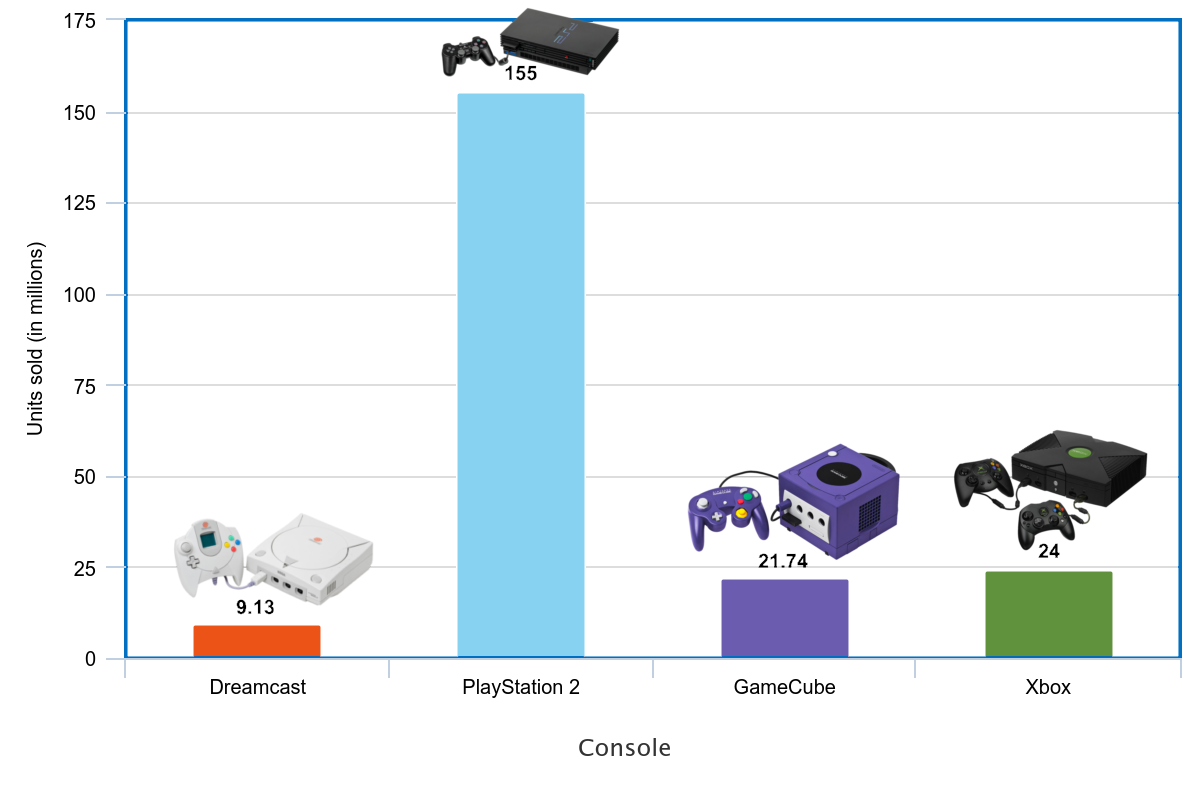
Bar chart showing the sales of the main 6th generation consoles

Console	Units sold
PlayStation 2	160 million (as of November 26, 2024)
Xbox	24 million (as of May 10, 2006)
GameCube	21.74 million (as of September 30, 2010)
V.Smile	11 million
Dreamcast	9.13 million (as of September 6, 2002)

=== Other consoles ===
These consoles were created for the mass market, like the 4 consoles listed above. However, they are less often noted, never saw a worldwide release, and/or have sold fewer units overall, and are therefore listed as 'Other'.

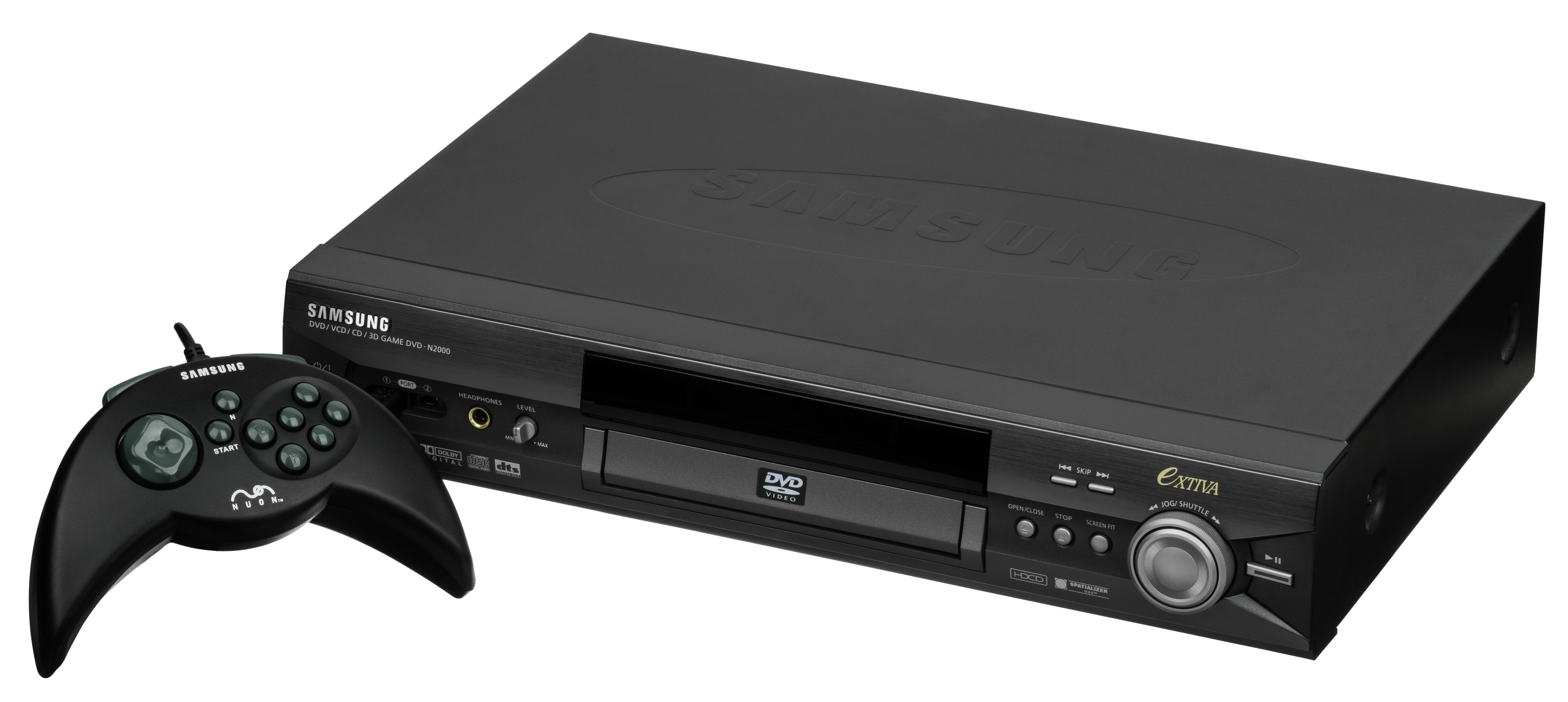
Nuon, a hybrid DVD player/gaming system that had a very small game library. Released by VM Labs in 2000.

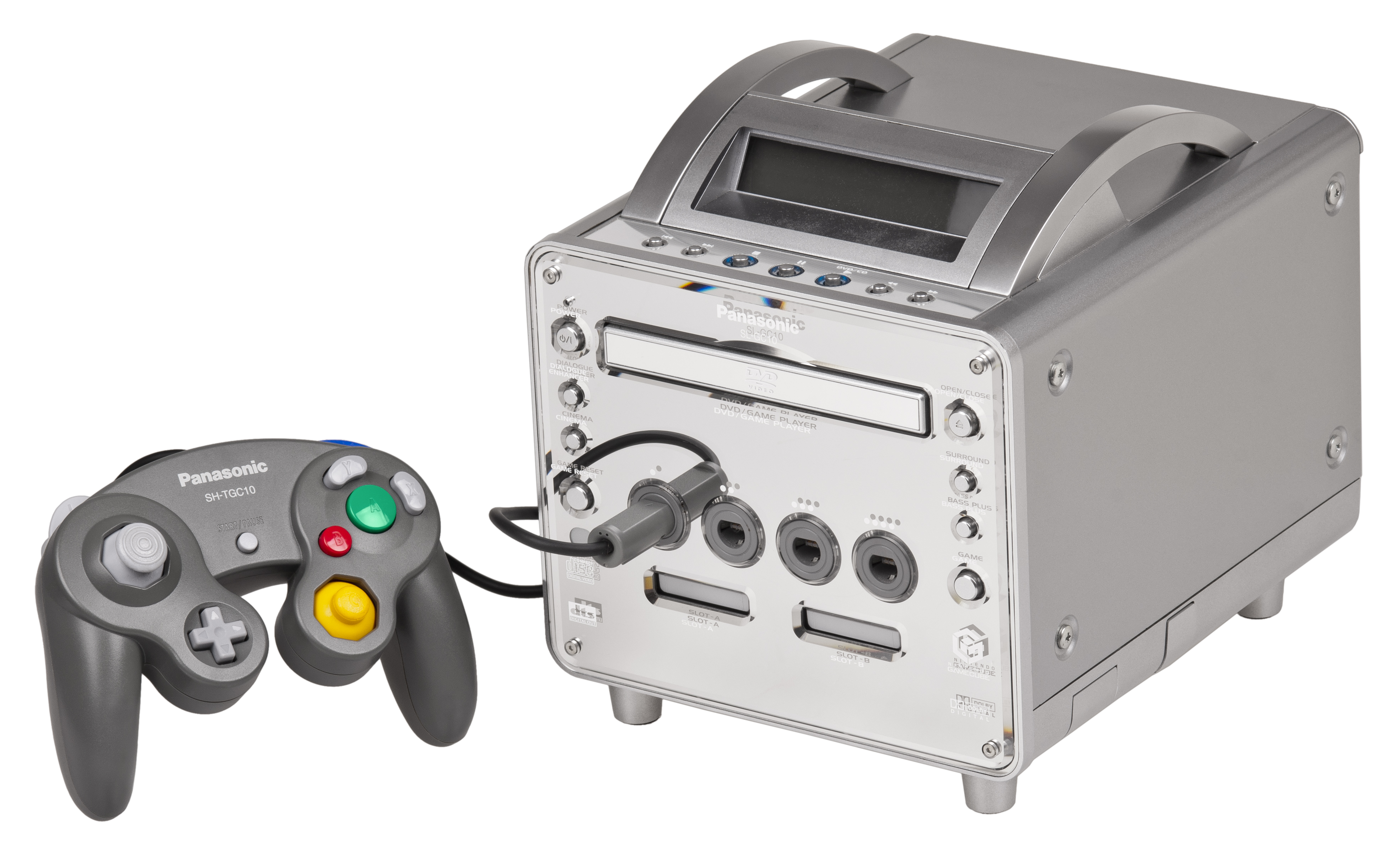
Panasonic Q, a DVD player hybrid version of the GameCube. Released by Panasonic in 2001.

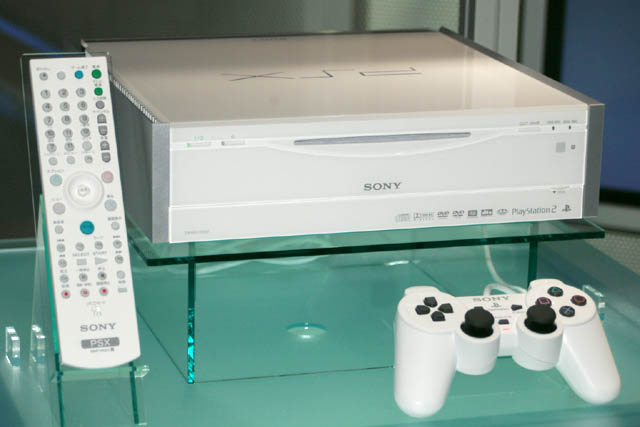
PSX, a PlayStation compatible digital video recorder. Released by Sony in 2003.

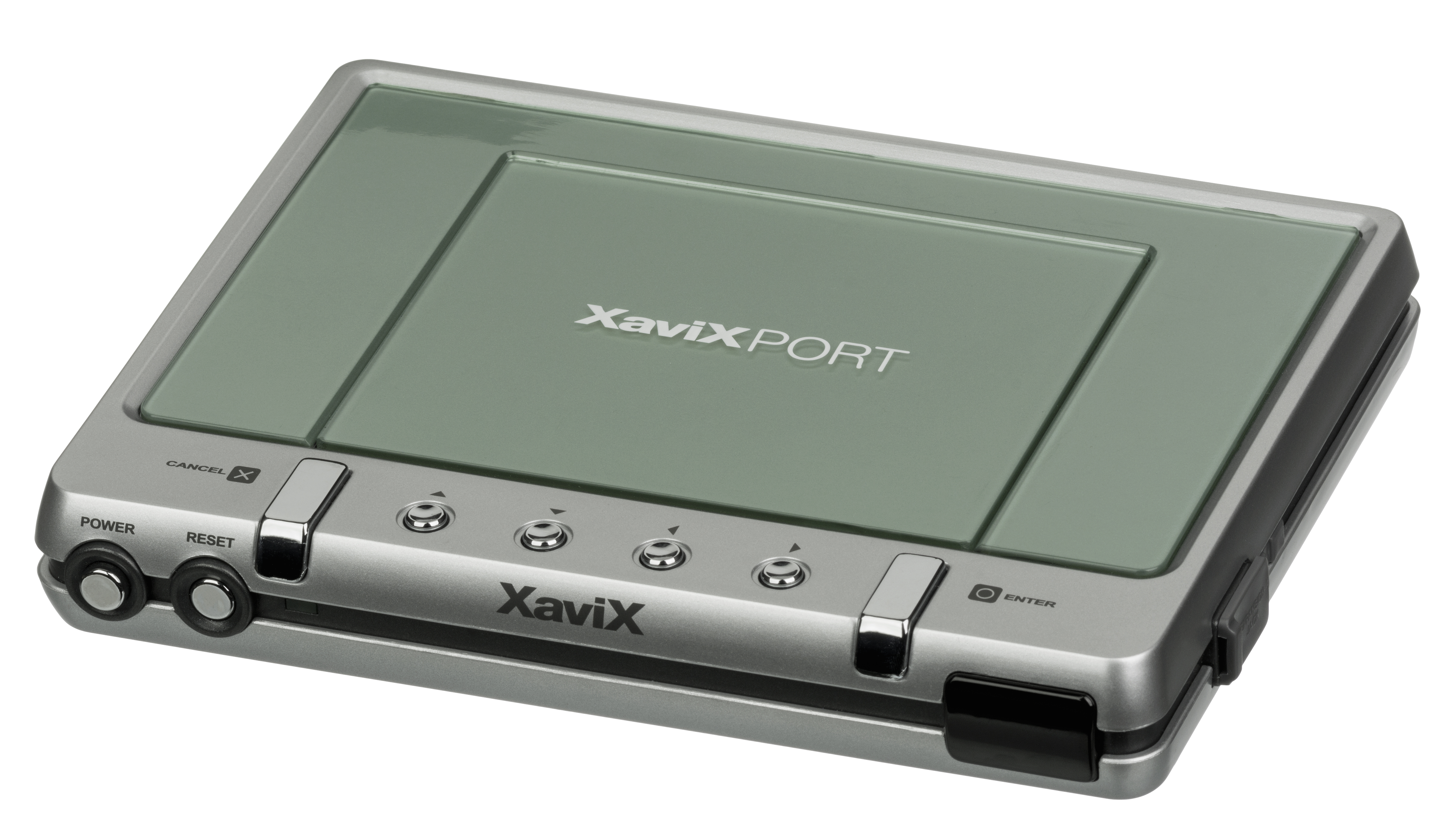
XaviX, a video gaming base console for the XaviX Interactive System. Released by SSD Company Limited in 2004.

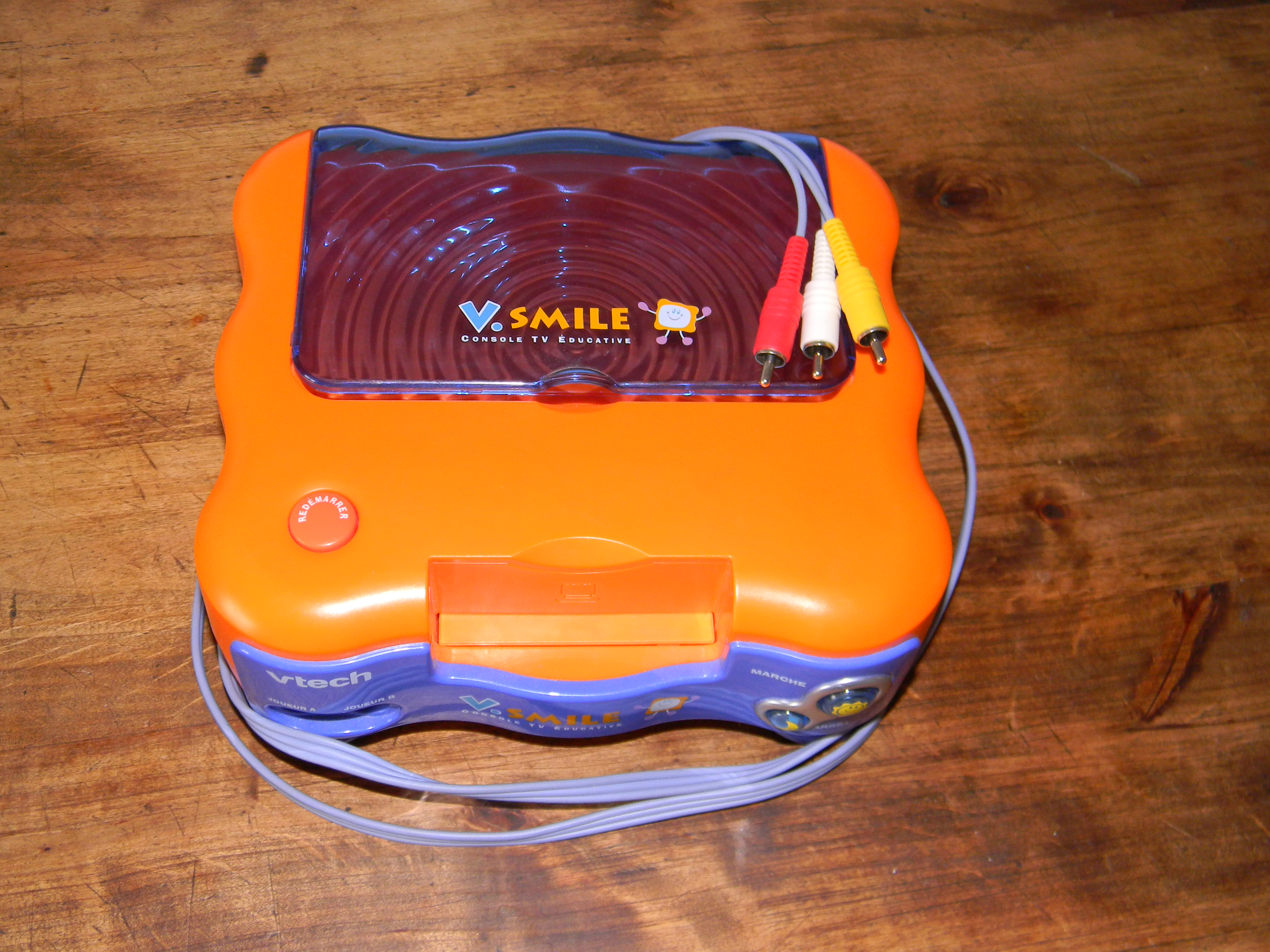
V.Smile, an educational video game console. Released by VTech in 2004.

== Bits and system power ==
Bit ratings for consoles largely fell by the wayside after the fifth generation (32/64-bit) era. The number of "bits" cited in console names referred to the CPU word size, but there was little to be gained from increasing the word size much beyond 32 bits; performance depended on other factors, such as central processing unit speed, graphics processing unit speed, channel capacity, data storage size, and memory speed, latency, and size.

The importance of the number of bits in the modern console gaming market has thus decreased due to the use of components that process data in varying word sizes. Previously, console manufacturers advertised the "n-bit talk" to overemphasize the hardware capabilities of their system. The Dreamcast and the PlayStation 2 were the last systems to use the term "128-bit" in their marketing to describe their capability.

It is not easy to compare the relative "power" of the different systems. Having a larger CPU word size does not necessarily make one console more powerful than another. Likewise, the operating frequency (clock rate, measured in terms of Hertz) of a system's CPU is not an accurate measure of performance either, except between systems of the same or similar architecture.

The Microsoft Xbox uses a 32-bit (general purpose) CISC x86 architecture CPU, with an instruction set equal to that of the Coppermine core Mobile Celeron, though it has less cache (128 kB) than the PC equivalent. It has 64 MB RAM (shared) and runs at 733 MHz. Because the Pentium 3 introduced SSE, the Xbox also had 128-bit SIMD capabilities. Its NV2A GPU, which is very similar to the GeForce 3 series of desktop GPUs, makes it the only console in its time with traditional vertex and pixel shaders.

The GameCube's CPU is a PowerPC CPU codenamed Gekko that runs at 485 MHz and was built by IBM. Its graphics processor, codenamed "Flipper", is comparable to the original ATI Radeon. The console has 43 MB of non-unified memory (24 MB of 1T-SRAM, 3 MB embedded 1T-SRAM, and 16 MB DRAM).

The PlayStation 2's CPU (known as the "128-bit Emotion Engine") has a 64-bit core with a 32-bit FPU. Coupled to two 128-bit Vector Units, this hybrid R5900 CPU is based on MIPS architecture. The PS2 also has an internal 10 Channel DMA Bus which is fully 128 bits wide. Paths between the Emotion Engine, RAM and the Graphics Synthesizer (GS) are also 128 bits wide. The PS2's unique hardware arrangement with no less than 10 processing units were difficult to come to grips with. Many developers struggled initially with programming the hardware. The PS2's Graphics Synthesizer (GS) has fast dedicated video memory, though it is limited in the amount of data it can hold. The 10 Channel 128 bit wide DMA bus could pump data to GS Memory as fast as the screen could update. Consequently, with the main memory being limited to 32MB, many of the PS2's games have reduced textures compared with versions for other consoles. It also does not have a hardware dedicated transform and lighting unit like the ones found in the Xbox and GameCube GPUs.

However the PS2's design allows a remarkable degree of flexibility and choice. For example, program control and general arithmetic could be handled by the CPU, while the Vector Units 0 and 1, could provide parallel processing of physics, clipping and transform and lighting to the scene. The Vector units were noted to be so versatile that Shadow of The Colossus used one of the vector units to do full Pixel shading for the fur of the Collossi.

The Dreamcast features a SuperH-4 32-bit reduced instruction set computing (RISC) instruction set architecture (ISA) using 16-bit fixed-length instructions, alongside a 64-bit double-precision superscalar unit, a 64-bit data bus allowing a variable width of either 8, 16, 32 or 64-bits, and a 128-bit floating-point bus. The PowerVR 2DC CLX2 chipset uses a unique method of rendering a 3D scene called Tile Based Deferred Rendering (TBDR): while storing polygons in triangle strip format in memory, the display is split into tiles associated with a list of visibly overlapping triangles onto which, using a process similar to ray tracing, rays are cast and a pixel is rendered from the triangle closest to the camera. After calculating the depths associated with each polygon for one tile row in 1 cycle, the whole tile is flushed to video memory before passing on to render the next tile. Once all information has been collated for the current frame, the tiles are rendered in turn to produce the final image.

== Handheld systems ==
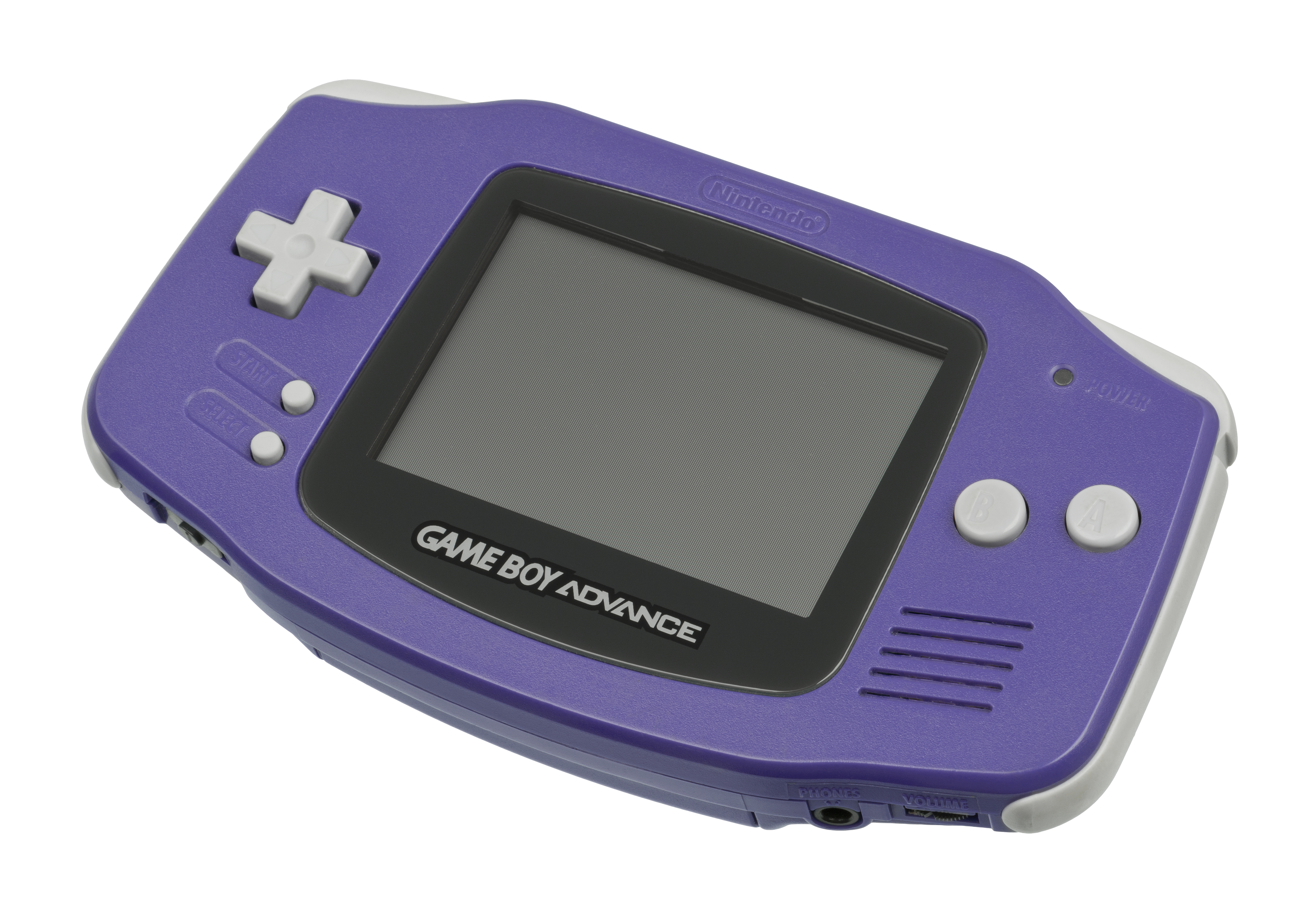
The Game Boy Advance was the best-selling handheld system.

During the sixth generation era, the handheld game console market expanded with the introduction of new devices from many different manufacturers. Nintendo maintained its dominant share of the handheld market with the release in 2001 of the Game Boy Advance, which featured many upgrades and new features over the Game Boy. Two redesigns of this system followed, the Game Boy Advance SP in 2003 and the Game Boy Micro in 2005. Also introduced was the Bandai's WonderSwan, launched in Japan in 1999. South Korean company Game Park introduced its GP32 handheld in 2001, and with it came the dawn of open source handheld consoles. The Game Boy Advance line of handhelds has sold 81.51 million units worldwide as of September 30, 2010.

A major new addition to the market was the trend for corporations to include a large number of "non-gaming" features into their handheld consoles, including cell phones, MP3 players, portable movie players, and PDA-like features. The handheld that started this trend was Nokia's N-Gage, which was released in 2003 and doubled primarily as a mobile phone. It went through a redesign in 2004 and was renamed the N-Gage QD. A second handheld, the Zodiac from Tapwave, was released in 2004; based on the Palm OS, it offered specialized gaming-oriented video and sound capabilities, but it had an unwieldy development kit due to the underlying Palm OS foundation.

A fairly uncommon handheld of the 6th generation was the vtech V.SMILE Pocket. A handheld version of their V.SMILE home console.

With more and more PDAs arriving during the previous generation, the difference between consumer electronics and traditional computing began to blur and cheap console technology grew as a result. It was said of PDAs that they were "the computers of handheld gaming" because of their multi-purpose capabilities and the increasingly powerful computer hardware that resided within them. This capability existed to move gaming beyond the last generation's 16-bit limitations; however, PDAs were still geared towards the typical businessman, and lacked new, affordable software franchises to compete with dedicated handheld gaming consoles.

=== Handheld comparison ===
Product Line		WonderSwan			Game Boy Advance			N-Gage	
Name		WonderSwan	WonderSwan Color	SwanCrystal	Game Boy Advance	Game Boy Advance SP	Game Boy Micro	N-Gage	N-Gage QD
Logo									
Manufacturer		Bandai			Nintendo			Nokia	
Console					Nintendo-Game-Boy-Advance-Purple-FL				
Release dates		JP: March 4, 1999	JP: December 9, 2000	JP: July 12, 2002	JP: March 21, 2001; NA: June 11, 2001; PAL: June 22, 2001	JP: February 14, 2003; NA: March 23, 2003; PAL: March 28, 2003	JP: September 13, 2005; NA: September 19, 2005; AU: November 3, 2005; EU: November 4, 2005	October 7, 2003	May 26, 2004
Launch prices	US$	-	-	-	US$99.99 (equivalent to $180 in 2025)	US$99.99 (equivalent to $180 in 2025)	US$99.99 (equivalent to $160 in 2025)	US$299.99 (equivalent to $530 in 2025)	US$179.99 (equivalent to $310 in 2025)
Launch prices	€	-	-	-	DEM249.99 (Equivalent to €127.82 in 2001 or €200 in 2023)	€129.99 (equivalent to €200 in 2023)		€289.99 (equivalent to €440 in 2023)	€229.99 (equivalent to €350 in 2023)
Launch prices	GBP	-	-	-		£89 (equivalent to £160 in 2025)		£229.99 (equivalent to £420 in 2025)	
Launch prices	A$	-	-	-		AU$199.99 (equivalent to $320 in 2022)			
Launch prices	JP¥	¥4,800 (equivalent to ¥5,310 in 2024)	¥6,800 (equivalent to ¥7,520 in 2024)	¥7,800 (equivalent to ¥8,630 in 2024)	¥9,800 (equivalent to ¥11,130 in 2024)	¥12,500 (equivalent to ¥14,200 in 2024)			
Discontinued		2003			2007			2006	
Media	Type	WonderSwan cartridge			Game Boy Advance Game Pak			MultiMediaCard (MMC)	
Media	Regional lockout	—N/a			Unrestricted			Unrestricted	
Media	Backward compatibility	—N/a	WonderSwan		Game Boy, Game Boy Color		none	—N/a	
Best-selling game		Final Fantasy			Pokémon Ruby and Sapphire, 16.22 million combined (as of November 25, 2004)			?	
Accessories (retail)		WonderSwan WS Headphone Adapter; WonderWave; WonderWitch; WonderBorg			Wireless Adapter; Infra-Red Adapter; GameCube – Game Boy Advance link cable: Play-Yan; e-Reader; Video; Cleaning Cartridge; Mobile Adapter; More...				
OS								Symbian S60	
CPU		16-bit, NEC V30 MZ			16.8 MHz, 32-bit, ARM7TDMI with embedded memory			104 MHz, 32-bit, RISC based on ARM9 series	
Memory		512 kbit (64 KB) RAM			32 kilobyte + 96 kilobyte VRAM (internal to the CPU), 256 kilobyte WRAM (outside the CPU)			16 megabyte RAM, 16 megabyte ROM (3.4 MB accessible for storage)	
Display		2.49-inch liquid-crystal display (LCD)	2.8-inch LCD	2.8-inch LCD	2.9-inch LCD	2.9-inch LCD	2-inch LCD		
Resolutions		224 x 144			240 × 160			176 × 208	
Audio		4-bit PCM channels			Stereo audio, with: 8-bit DAC, capable of either streaming wave data or outputting wave samples processed and mixed in software; Two square wave voices; One programmable WS voice; One white noise generator; Optional sampling through the WS channel			Stereo audio (using headphones), with: Support for Standard MIDI, SP MIDI and AMR audio	
Interface		Two D-pads; Two face buttons			D-pad; Four face buttons; Two shoulder buttons			D-pad; Numbered keypad; Music player, Radio and Menu hotkeys; Dial and hang up buttons; Four other face buttons; Microphone	
Dimensions			12.8 × 24.5 × 82mm (5.04 in × 2.93 in × 0.96 in)		144.5 × 24.5 × 82 mm (5.69 × 0.96 × 3.2 inches)	84 × 82 × 24.4 mm (3.3 × 3.23 × 0.96 inches)	50 × 101 × 17.2 mm (2 × 4 × 0.7 inches)	70 mm (2.8 in) (h) 134 mm (5.3 in) (w) 20 mm (0.79 in) (d):	118 mm (4.6 in) (w) 68 mm (2.7 in) (h) 22 mm (0.87 in) (d)
Weight			96 g (3.4 oz)		140 g (4.9 oz)	142 g (5.0 oz)	80 g (2.8 oz)	137 g (4.8 oz)	143 g (5.0 oz)
Online service								N-Gage Arena	
Storage								3.4 MB internal storage, MMC	
Battery life		40 hours	15 hours		GBA: 15 hours GBA SP: GB Micro:	10 hours continuous play with light on, 18 hours with light off	5 hours with top brightness and sound, 8 hours with both features on default	2 hours continuous play	4 hours continuous play
Units sold (all models combined)		Japan: 3.5 million (combined) WonderSwan: 1.55 million WonderSwan Color: 1.1 million			Worldwide: 81.51 million (as of September 30, 2010) Japan: 16.96 million Americas: 41.64 million Other: 22.91 million			Worldwide: 3 million (as of July 30, 2007)	

Note: First year of release is the first year of the system's worldwide availability.

=== Other handhelds ===
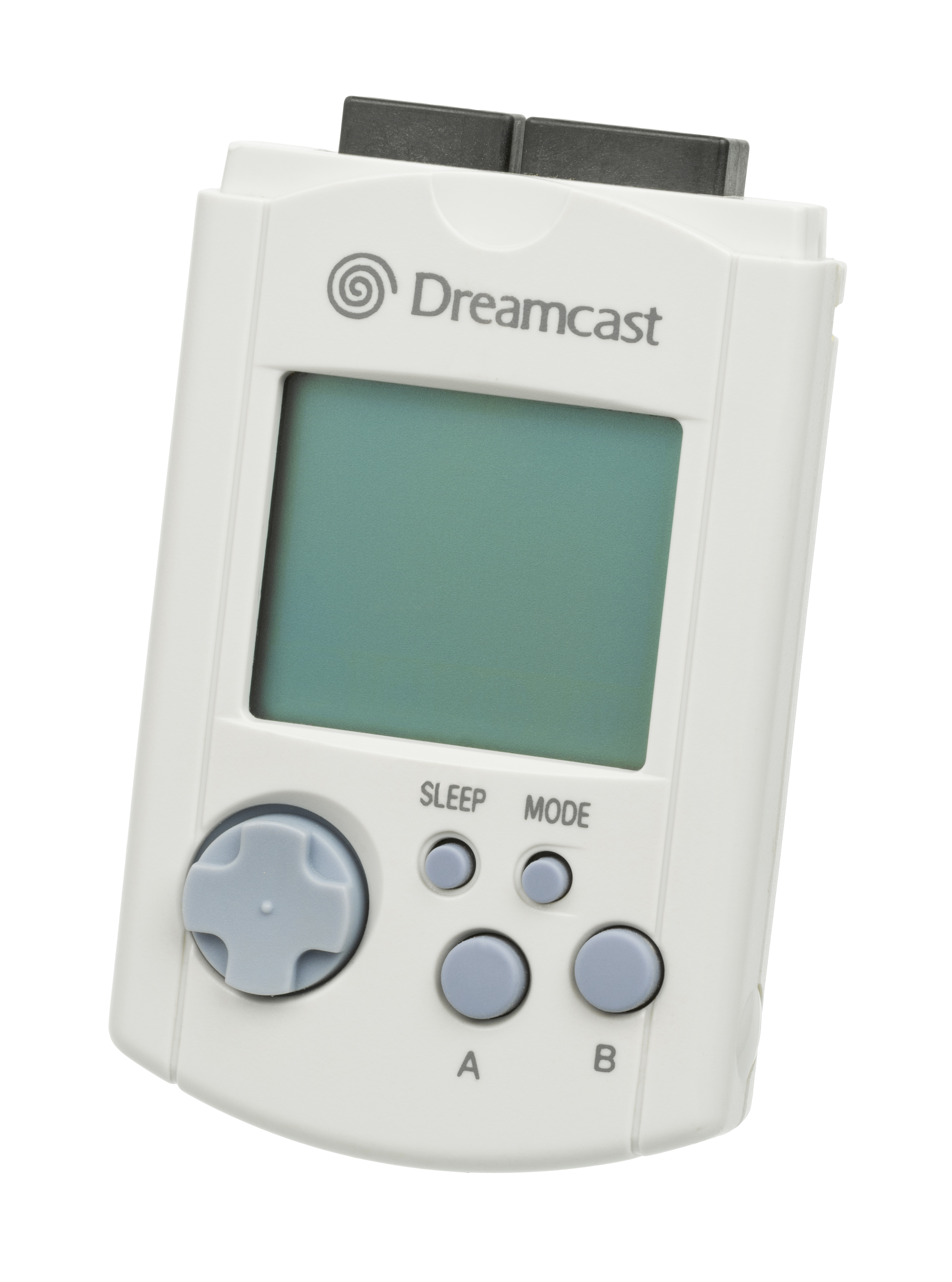
VMU (1998) Created by Sega as a memory card for the Dreamcast

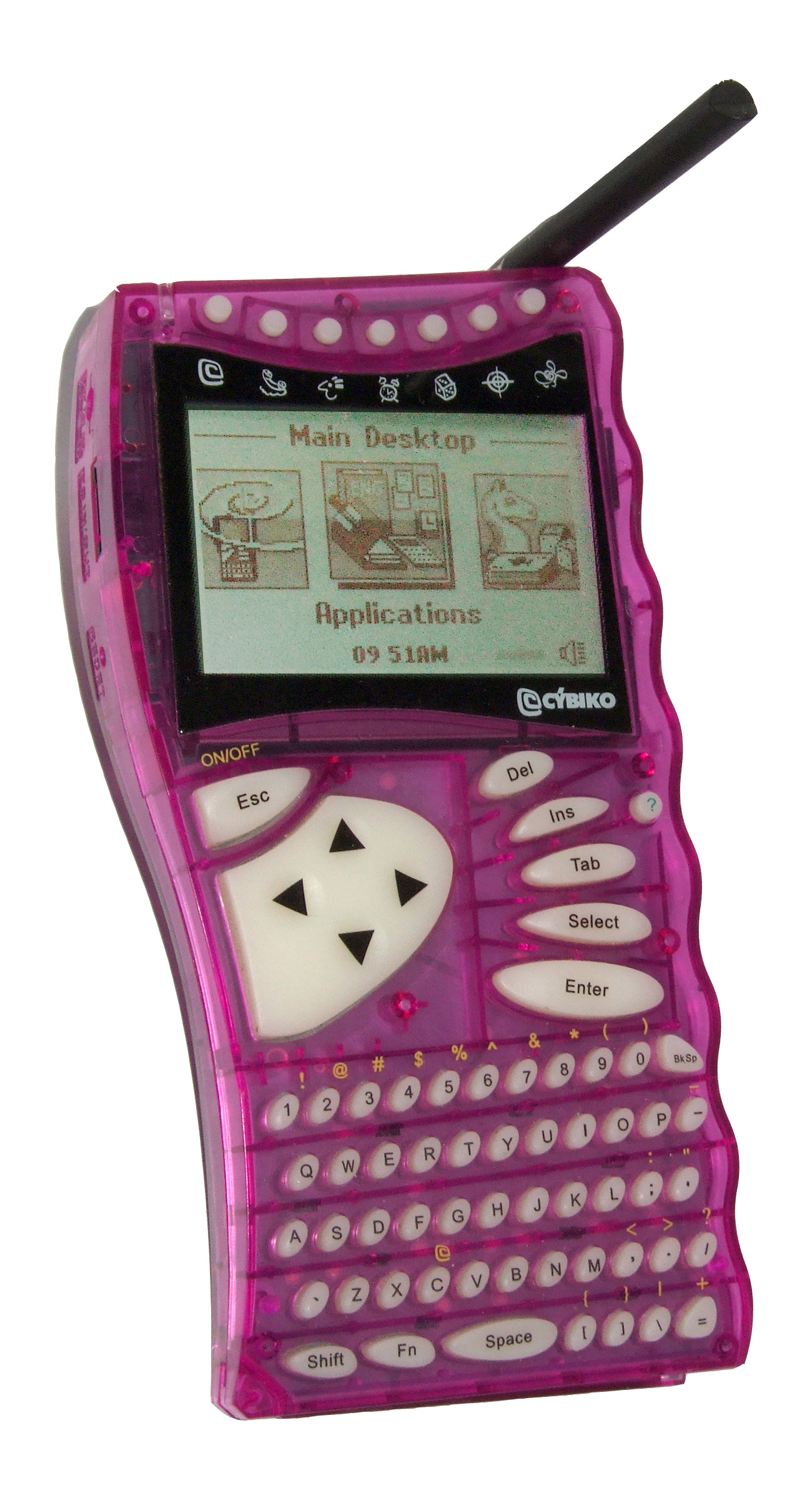
Cybiko (2000)

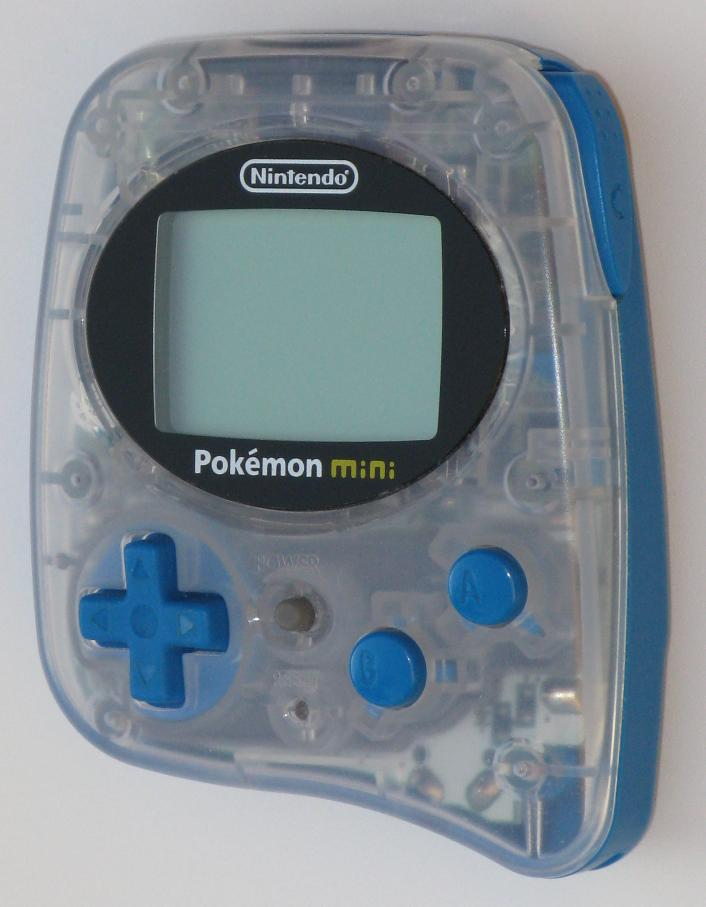
Pokémon Mini (2001)

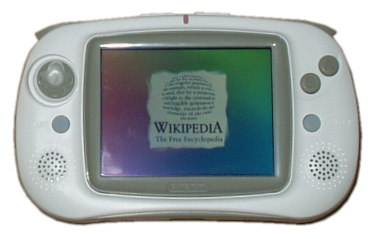
GP32
Released in 2001, discontinued around 2005 – South Korea only

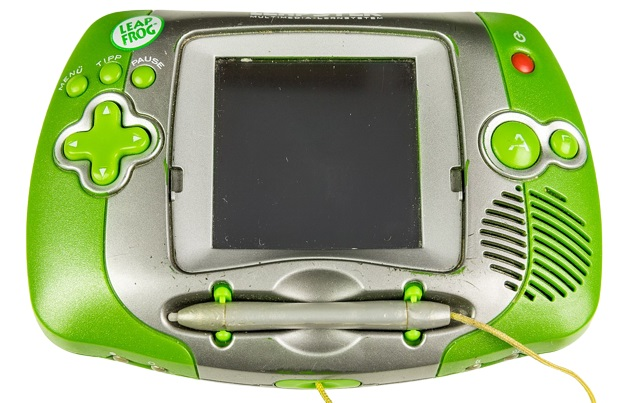
Leapster Learning Game System (2003)

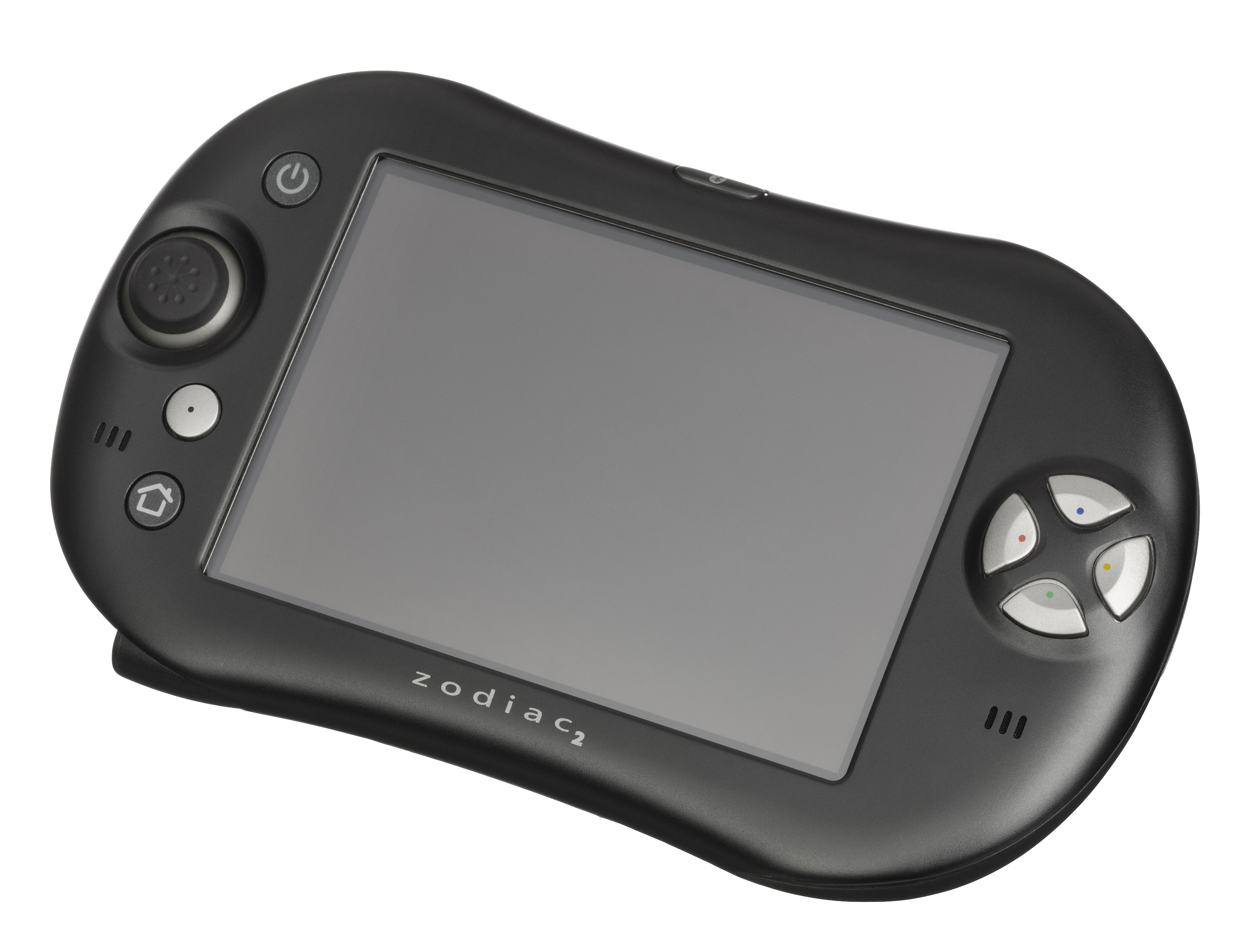
Tapwave Zodiac (2003)

=== Sales ===
Console	Units sold
Game Boy Advance (figure includes GBA SP and Game Boy Micro)	81.51 million
Leapster	4 million
WonderSwan	3.5 million
N-Gage	3 million
Cybiko	500,000
Tapwave Zodiac	less than 200,000 units
GP32	30,000

== Trends ==
=== Market convergence ===
Major publishers, such as Activision, Electronic Arts, and Ubisoft adopted a cross-platform strategy, releasing versions of their games for PC, all major consoles, and in some cases, handhelds as well. The sixth generation was the first to help console and computer software grow closer together as well as outperform the arcade market in features, graphics and business. The Dreamcast, which had an official Windows CE Development Kit to help porting games from PCs to Dreamcast, and the Xbox, which was made from off-the-shelf PC parts and hosted many PC ports, factored into this also.

=== Controversial games ===
While the sixth generation was not the first to have its share of controversial games, this generation was noted to have extensive criticism by public figures of "objectionable" content in gaming such as sex, crime, violence, profanity, and drug use as well as topics of debate such as religion, politics and economics.

The sixth generation was also notable because it saw the continuation of lawmakers taking actions against the video game industry. The most famous were Rockstar Games' Manhunt and Grand Theft Auto games (Grand Theft Auto III and Grand Theft Auto: Vice City) facing lawsuits over allegedly influencing minors to commit crimes, while Grand Theft Auto: San Andreas was briefly given an adult rating and removed from most stores over the availability of an abandoned sex mini-game using the Hot Coffee mod.

The sixth generation also coincided with the September 11 attacks in New York City and the Pentagon, which had a huge impact on the entertainment industry, including the video game industry; in the subsequent market climate, multiple games were edited in response to the sensitivity surrounding the event. Prior to its release, Metal Gear Solid 2: Sons of Liberty depicted a submersible mobile fortress hijacked by terrorists destroying a good portion of Manhattan in view of the twin towers (this can be found in the "Document of Metal Gear Solid 2" making-of feature). Similarly, several undisclosed modifications were made in Grand Theft Auto III, such as a change to the police cars' color scheme (the old scheme resembled that of NYPD's older blue and white design) and altered cover art (the European release featured the original artwork); Rockstar Games estimates that the changes amounted to 1% in changed content. The Dreamcast game Propeller Arena was never officially released, possibly due to a certain level which was visually very similar to the September 11 attacks.

=== Emulation and retro gaming ===
Because of the increased computing power of video game consoles and the widespread usage of emulators, the sixth generation saw the rise of console emulation and retro gaming on a vast scale. Many games for older systems were updated with superior graphics or sound and re-released for current consoles. Commonly emulated games included those released for the Nintendo Entertainment System, the Super Nintendo Entertainment System, the Mega Drive/Genesis, the PlayStation (the PS2 can play PS1 games natively), and the Nintendo 64.

Also during this generation, the computing power of handheld consoles became capable of supporting games made for some of the earliest gaming consoles and several companies released remakes of classic games for the handhelds. Nintendo introduced a line of NES and SNES games for its Game Boy Advance handheld, including remakes such as Final Fantasy I & II: Dawn of Souls and Nintendo's Metroid: Zero Mission. Also, an increasing number of third-party developers, including Midway Games, Capcom, Namco, Atari, Tecmo, and Sega, released anthology collections of some of their old games. Additionally, many video games and video game series that were originally confined to Japan were released in North America and Europe for the first time.

=== Rise of online gaming ===
Online gaming, which in previous generations had been almost an exclusive domain of PC games, became more prominent in video game consoles during this generation. The Dreamcast initiated this change with its built in modem, internet browsing software, and ability to play certain games online. The PlayStation 2, Xbox and GameCube also offered online gaming, though their approaches and commitment to it varied greatly. The Xbox offered an integrated service called Xbox Live that cost $50 per year and was only compatible with a broadband internet connection. Its ability to connect gamers for online multi-player matches and its ideal experience was a considerable factor in allowing the Xbox to gain a foothold in the western market, especially in the first-person shooter genre. The PlayStation 2 left its online gaming service up to each individual game publisher, and though it was free to use, it was not always an ideal experience, especially with games published by small developers. The SOCOM series was one of the most popular online competitive games for the PS2. The GameCube did not offer online play for any of its first-party titles, with only Sega's Phantasy Star Online series and Homeland making official use of the console's online capabilities. In addition, online capability was not out-of-the-box; an adapter was needed to hook the GameCube to the internet.

=== Mergers ===
Many game publishing companies with a long established history merged with their competitors: Microsoft bought second-party developer Rare in 2002; Square merged with Enix to form Square Enix in 2003 and then later bought Taito; Sega merged with Sammy to form Sega Sammy Holdings in 2004; Konami bought a majority share of Hudson Soft; Namco merged with Bandai to form Bandai Namco Holdings in 2006.

== Software ==
=== Milestone titles ===
- Burnout 3: Takedown (PS2, Xbox) by Criterion Games and EA Games was released to universal acclaim from critics, for their addictive gameplay, visuals and a shift to a more aggressive style of racing game in comparison to its predecessors. Retrospective coverage of the game has been highly positive with some publications declaring it as the greatest arcade racer game ever made and the peak of the Burnout series.
- Dead or Alive 2 (Arcade, DC, PS2) by Team Ninja and Tecmo received universal acclaim with a GameRankings and Metacritic score of 91/100, and is considered as one of the greatest fighting games of all time. It was notable for improving and popularizing the concept of multi-tiered environments. Dead or Alive 3 (Xbox) also received acclaim and was a bestseller with over 2 million units sold worldwide, scoring 37 out of 40 on Famitsu. It was notable for improving and expanding on what the previous game offered, praised for its advanced graphics and was declared "The most technologically advanced fighting game ever made".
- Final Fantasy X (PS2) by Square (now Square Enix) refined many elements found in its predecessors, adding a completely different battle system. Within four days of its release in Japan the game had sold over 1.4 million copies in pre-orders, setting the record for the fastest-selling console RPG.
- Forza Motorsport (Xbox) by Turn 10 Studios and Microsoft Studios received universal critical acclaim and is considered to have set a new standard for the racing genre. This game received universal acclaim according to the review aggregation website Metacritic.
- God of War and God of War II (PS2) by Santa Monica Studio and Sony Computer Entertainment (SCE) were both released to universal acclaim from critics for their gameplay, graphics and story.
- Grand Theft Auto III, Vice City, and San Andreas (PS2, Xbox, PC) by Rockstar popularized "sandbox" style gameplay in an urban crime setting, which has since been widely imitated. In addition, it brought violence and other potentially objectionable content in video games back into the mainstream spotlight, thus reviving the video game controversy.
- Half-Life 2 (PC, Xbox) by Valve was praised for its advanced physics, animation, sound, AI, graphics, gameplay, and narrative, and was named Game of the Decade at the Spike Video Game Awards.
- Halo: Combat Evolved (Xbox, PC) by Bungie and Microsoft Studios was by far the most successful launch title for the Xbox. Halo 2 set records as the fastest grossing release in entertainment history and was still very successful on the Xbox Live online gaming service until support was dropped in April 2010.
- Jet Set Radio (DC) by Smilebit and Sega received universal acclaim for its arcade-style gameplay, up-tempo music and cel-shaded visuals. It popularized the use of cel-shaded visuals in video games. Jet Set Radio Future (Xbox) improved and expanded on what the original game offered, and also received critical acclaim.
- The Legend of Zelda: The Wind Waker (GC) by Nintendo EAD and Nintendo remains one of the most critically acclaimed games of the generation. Critics praised the vivid artistry and timeless gameplay. It has a score of 96% on Metacritic, and it is the fourth game to obtain a perfect score from video game reviewer Famitsu. Likewise, The Legend of Zelda: Twilight Princess (GC) proved to be another important title in the series released this generation. The title is perhaps best remembered for the excitement caused by its announcement trailer at E3 2004. It was released to widespread critical acclaim with an average of 96% on Metacritic. The game drew much praise for its scale and cinematic style with many reviewers declaring it the best game in the series. Likewise, it was seen as a transitional title being released on both the GameCube and Wii – which resulted in it being the best-selling title in the series since Ocarina of Time.
- Metal Gear Solid 2: Sons of Liberty (PS2, Xbox, PC) and Metal Gear Solid 3: Snake Eater (PS2) by Konami Computer Entertainment Japan and Konami improved upon the stealth genre by adding many new abilities, and for the first time in its respective genre made the surroundings nearly completely interactive. Both games achieved widespread critical acclaim, as they improved many elements from their predecessor.
- Metroid Prime (GC) by Retro Studios and Nintendo is one of the generation's highest-rated titles, with a score of 96.3 on GameRankings and a 97 on Metacritic. The game garnered critical praise and commercial success, selling more than a million units in North America alone. It was also the eighth best-selling GameCube game in Australia, and more than 78,000 copies were sold in Japan. It won a number of Game of the Year awards, and it is considered by many critics and gamers to be one of the greatest video games ever made, remaining one of the highest-rated games on Metacritic.
- NFL 2K1 (DC) by Visual Concepts and Sega was the first football game to feature online play.
- Ninja Gaiden (Xbox) by Team Ninja and Tecmo received universal acclaim with a GameRankings score of 93% and Metacritic score of 91/100, praised for its intense difficulty and attention to detail, selling over 1.5 million copies worldwide. Ninja Gaiden Black (Xbox), an update to the original, also received acclaim and praised for its additional content along with the additions of both an easier and harder difficulty settings.
- Phantasy Star Online (DC, GC, Xbox, PC) by Sonic Team and Sega, the first console MMORPG, has been cited as one of the most groundbreaking and influential games of the generation. It received "generally favorable" reviews per ratings aggregator Metacritic.
- Pokémon Ruby and Sapphire (GBA) Despite the fact that the games received some backlash due to connectivity issues with the older games, which was resolved with the release of future games, these games still received positive reception from critics and a loyal fanbase for adding much more features innovation to the Pokémon series that are still a part of the franchise to this very day. They eventually became the best-selling games for the Game Boy Advance, selling roughly over 16.22 million copies worldwide as of October 2013.
- Resident Evil 4 (GC, PS2, PC) by Capcom Production Studio 4 and Capcom revamped the franchise in a new, more action-oriented direction. It remains one of the highest rated games of the generation.
- Rez (DC, PS2) by United Game Artists and Sega received significant critical acclaim. The game, about a computer virus named Swayzak invading the mainframe of a computer, has been cited as one of the greatest videogames ever made and a significant example of videogames as art.
- Shadow of the Colossus (PS2) by Team Ico and SCE has been frequently cited as an example of video games as art. Many reviewers consider the game's soundtrack to be one of its greatest aspects. In addition to Roar of the Earth won the award for "Soundtrack of the Year" in the US-based video game magazine Electronic Gaming Monthly, GameSpot commented that the musical score conveyed, and often intensified, the mood of any given situation, while it was described as "one of the finest game soundtracks ever" by a reviewer from Eurogamer.
- Shenmue (DC) by Sega AM2 and Sega is regarded as a major step forward for 3D open-world gameplay, introduced the quick time event mechanic in its modern form, and has been widely cited as one of the best and most influential games ever made.
- Sonic Adventure (DC, GC, PC) by Sonic Team was the first main Sonic the Hedgehog game to feature 3D gameplay. It received a perfect score from Computer and Video Games, who called it one of the greatest video games of all time, and GamesRadar wrote it "changed the gaming world forever".
- Soulcalibur (Arcade, DC) by Project Soul and Namco is the first fighting game on any platform to have ever received a perfect 10.0 rating from IGN and GameSpot and also a perfect 40/40 (second of only fifteen games) from Japanese gaming magazine, Famitsu. Soul Calibur II (Arcade, PS2, GC, Xbox) was a bestseller for all three home consoles on which it was released and was notable for featuring exclusive characters for every version released.
- Star Wars: Knights of the Old Republic (PC, Xbox) by BioWare and LucasArts has been cited as one of the best games of the generation and greatest games of all time. Its sequel, Star Wars Knights of the Old Republic II: The Sith Lords, also garnered critical acclaim.
- Super Mario Sunshine (GC) by Nintendo Entertainment Analysis & Development (Nintendo EAD) and Nintendo is the highest-rated 3D platformer of the generation with a Metacritic score of 92/100. This game was the first 3D Super Mario game which included the ability to ride Yoshi. This feature reappeared in Super Mario Galaxy 2 where the Twisty Trials Galaxy in World S is another recurring theme from Super Mario Sunshine, based on one of the missions "The Secret of Ricco Tower".
- Super Smash Bros. Melee (GC) by Hal Laboratory and Nintendo went on to become one of the most popular and most played games on the GameCube console which is a widely played competitive video game and has been featured in several high-profile tournaments. Many consider it to be the most competitively viable game in the series.
- Tekken Tag Tournament (PS2) was a launch title for the PlayStation 2 and is regarded as one of the best PS2 titles ever, and is also considered one of if not the most significant entry to the Tekken series. Throughout the sixth generation, Tekken Tag was the fighting game of choice for many tournaments. The game was also praised for its graphical leap from the arcade on to the then, new generation of consoles, on the PlayStation 2.
- Virtua Fighter 4 (Arcade, PS2) by Sega AM2 and Sega received universal acclaim, with a Metacritic score of 94/100, and is considered to have set a new standard for 3D fighting games. In Japan, the PlayStation 2 version sold 356,897 during its first week on sale in early 2002. Worldwide sales of the PS2 port exceeded 1.5 million by June 2002. On release, Famitsu magazine scored the PlayStation 2 version of the game a 37 out of 40.

== See also ==
- 1990s in video games
- 2000s in video games
