= XGP =

Unreleased handheld game console

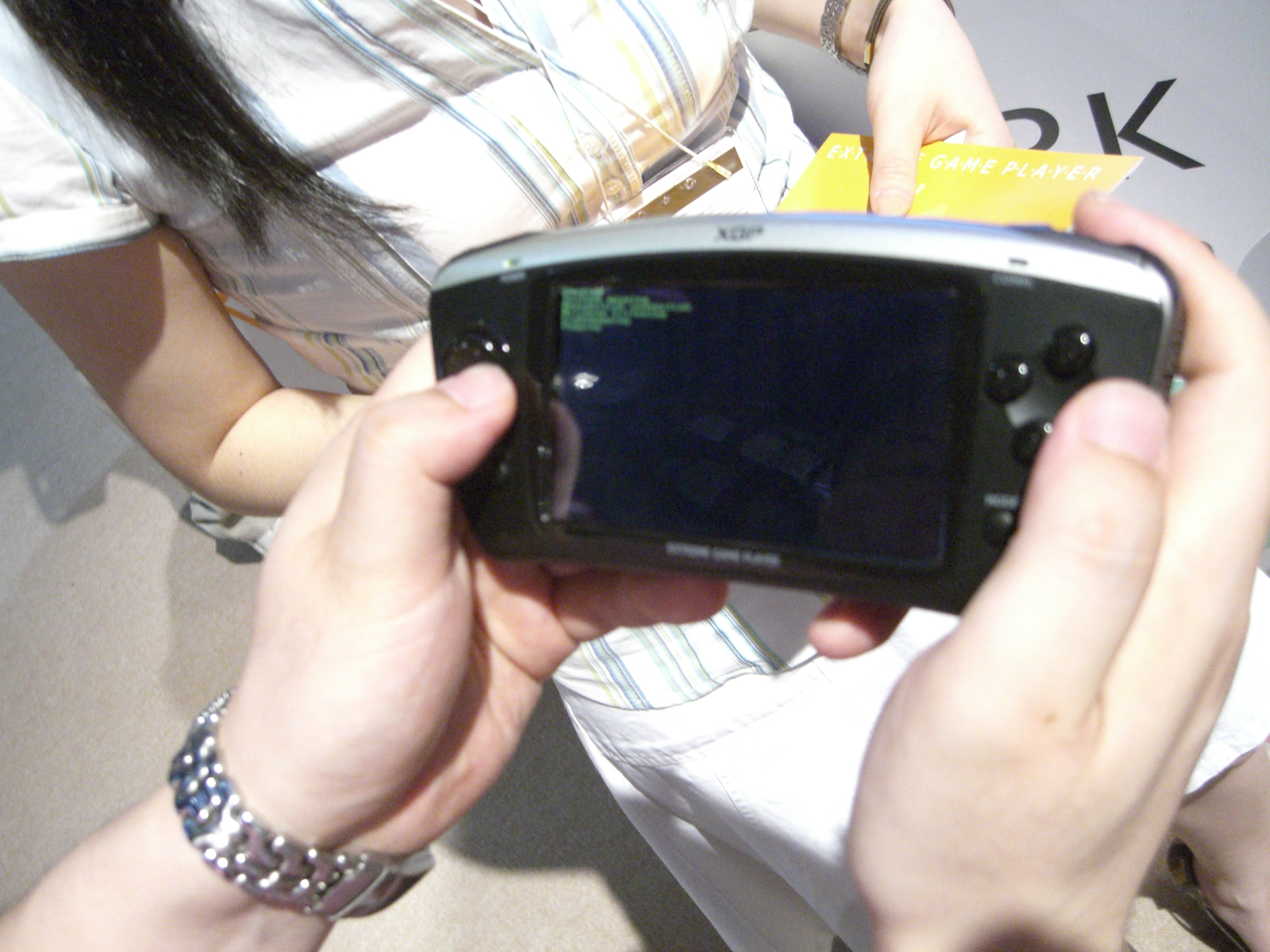
- Manufacturer: GamePark
- Type: Handheld game console
- Generation: Seventh generation era
- Lifespan: Never Released
- Introductory price: $300
- Media: Secure Digital card
- System on a chip: MagicEyes VRENDER-3D
- CPU: Dual CPU: 200MHz Host ARM920T 200MHz ARM940T
- Memory: 64MB-128MB (DDR SDRAM)
- Storage: 64MB NAND Flash

The XGP (Extreme Game Player) was a concept portable video game system created by the Korean company GamePark as the follow-up to its GP32 handheld. Initially announced in 2005, the XGP was finally announced in March 2006 along with the release of the similar XGP Mini and the XGP Kids. The company went bankrupt before releasing any of the models.

The XGP was scheduled to be released in three models: the XGP, the XGPmini and the XGP Kids. GamePark said that it did not wish to compete with Sony and Nintendo with the device. The XGP Kids was aimed towards children and therefore had a significantly lower price point. It was designed to run simpler games tailored to an audience besides "hardcore gamers". While the GP32 was only available in select markets—Korea and parts of Europe and Asia—or had to be imported, the XGP was expected to be marketed worldwide

Since Gamepark declared bankruptcy in March 2007, the XGP went unreleased. This left GP2X—created by splinter company Gamepark Holdings—as the only successor to the GP32 to make it to market.

== Models ==
GamePark was planning on releasing three models of the XGP; the high-end XGP, the middle-range XGP mini, and the low-end XGP Kids.

=== XGP ===
The XGP system was to focus on downloadable commercial games, as well as on free homebrew content.

The ability to use Linux on was officially announced, as well as Windows CE and Gamepark's own minimalistic operating system GPOS. The system was designed for multimedia content such as movies, MP3s, and the mobile television standard T-DMB. It may feature a 4" 16:9 widescreen aspect ratio screen with a display resolution of 480 x 272.

Specifications

- Based on the MagicEyes VRENDER-3D System-on-a-Chip (SoC)
- Screen: 480 × 272, 1.6 million colors, 4-inch TFT LCD, Widescreen (16:10) aspect ratio
- Main CPU: ARM920T advertised as 266 MHz (actual VRENDER-3D SoC contains a 200 MHz ARM920T)
- OS: Updated GPOS, Linux, and possibly a WindowsCE "option" as well.
- Graphics Accelerator: 1.5 million polygons per second (OpenGL ES supported)
- Sound: 64Polys 44.1 kHz, 16 bit stereo sound
- Network: WiFi - 802.11 b/g, WiBro
- NAND Flash Memory: 64 MB
- RAM: 64 MB DDR SDRAM (128 MB at release time was rumored)
- Storage: Secure Digital card
- Battery: Built-in Rechargeable Lithium ion battery
- Other Features: TV-Out, USB 2.0, open sdk
- Customer Target Price: $300

=== XGP Mini ===
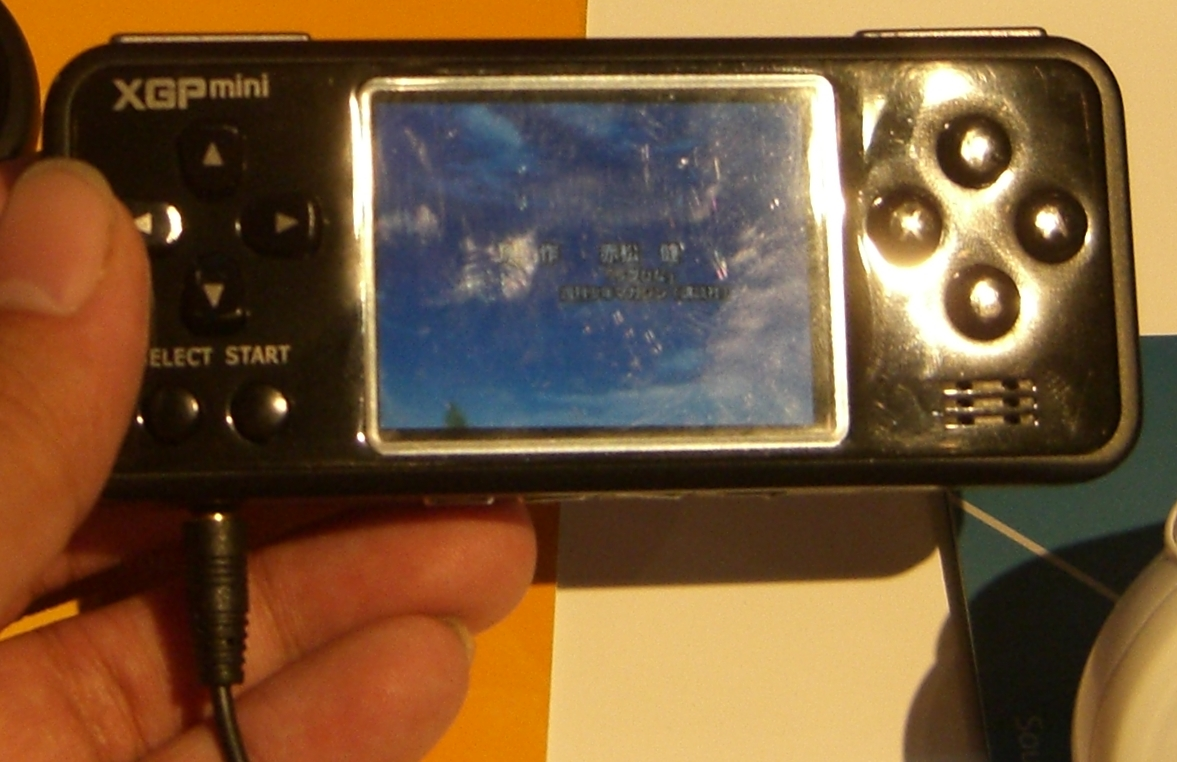
A black XGP Mini

The XGP Mini's specifications are similar to the XGP's, but the device was much smaller than the XGP—much like the Game Boy Micro as compared to the Game Boy Advance. In contrast to the XGP, it featured no wireless connectivity and half the DDR SDRAM at 32 MB.

Specifications

- Based on the MagicEyes VRENDER-3D System-on-a-Chip (SoC)
- Screen: 2.2" 320 × 240, 256k colors, 4:3 Aspect Ratio.
- Main CPU: ARM920T Advertised as 266 MHz (Actual VRENDER-3D SoC contains a 200 MHz ARM920T)
- OS: GPOS
- Graphics Accelerator: 1.5 million polygons per second (OpenGL ES supported)
- Sound: 64Polys 44.1 kHz, 16 bit Stereo sound
- NAND Flash Memory: 64 MB
- RAM: 32 MB DDR SDRAM (Rumored to be 96 MB at launch)
- Storage: Secure Digital card
- Battery: Built-in Rechargeable Lithium ion battery
- Other Features: USB 2.0, open SDK
- Customer Target Price: $150

=== XGP Kids ===
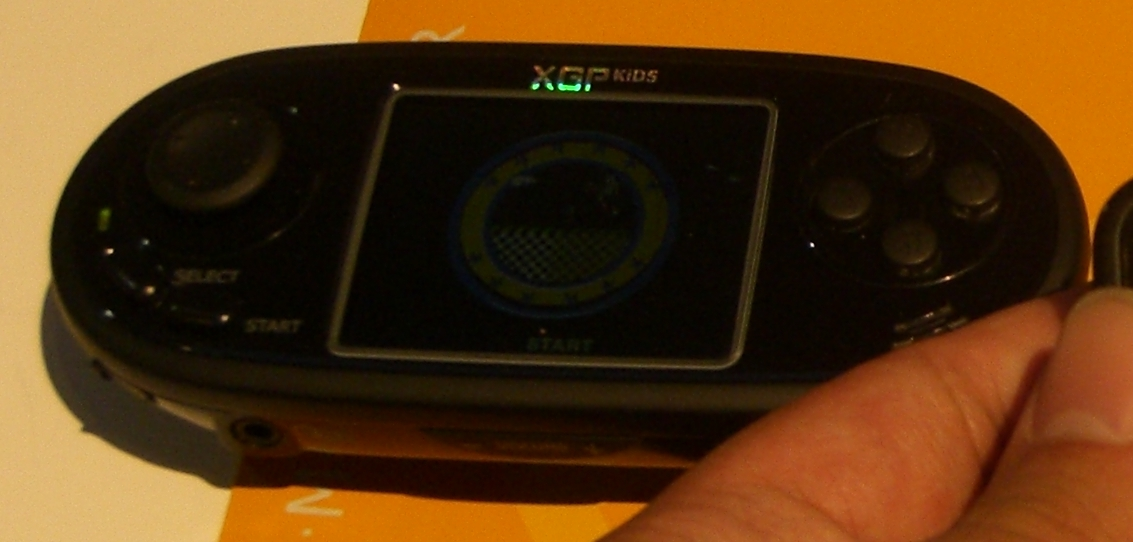
Black XGP Kids

The XGP Kids was technically similar to the GP32. The two consoles' specifications differ in screen size and resolution, available memory (Kids adds 2 MB NOR Flash memory), processor type, and storage. These differences would prevent the console from being backwards compatible with the GP32, although GP32 software could be reprogrammed to work on the XGP Kids. The device was intended to be relatively inexpensive and to give a chance to those who missed out on the GP32's limited production run to get something very much like a BLU+. The XGP Kids, like the XGP Mini, will have a smaller screen (at only 2.2 inches (56 mm)) than the XGP and GP32.

Specifications

- Screen: 2.2" 220 × 176 LCD, 65k colors, 4:3.
- Main CPU: ARM940T 140 MHz
- OS: GPOS
- Sound: 16 bit Stereo sound, 64Polys 44.1 kHz
- Storage: 2 MB NOR Flash, Secure Digital card
- RAM: 8 MB DDR SDRAM
- Battery: 2 AA batteries
- Other Features: USB 1.1, open SDK
- Customer Target Price: $75

== See also ==
- GP32 - The predecessor of the XGP
- GP2X - The unofficial successor of the GP32, designed by GamePark Holdings
- GamePark Holdings - The creators of the GP2X
- GamePark - The creators of the GP32 & XGP
- GP2X Wiz - The official successor of the GP2X
- OpenPandora - The unofficial successor of the GP2X
