= Xavix =

Video game console

XaviXPORT / Domyos Interactive System
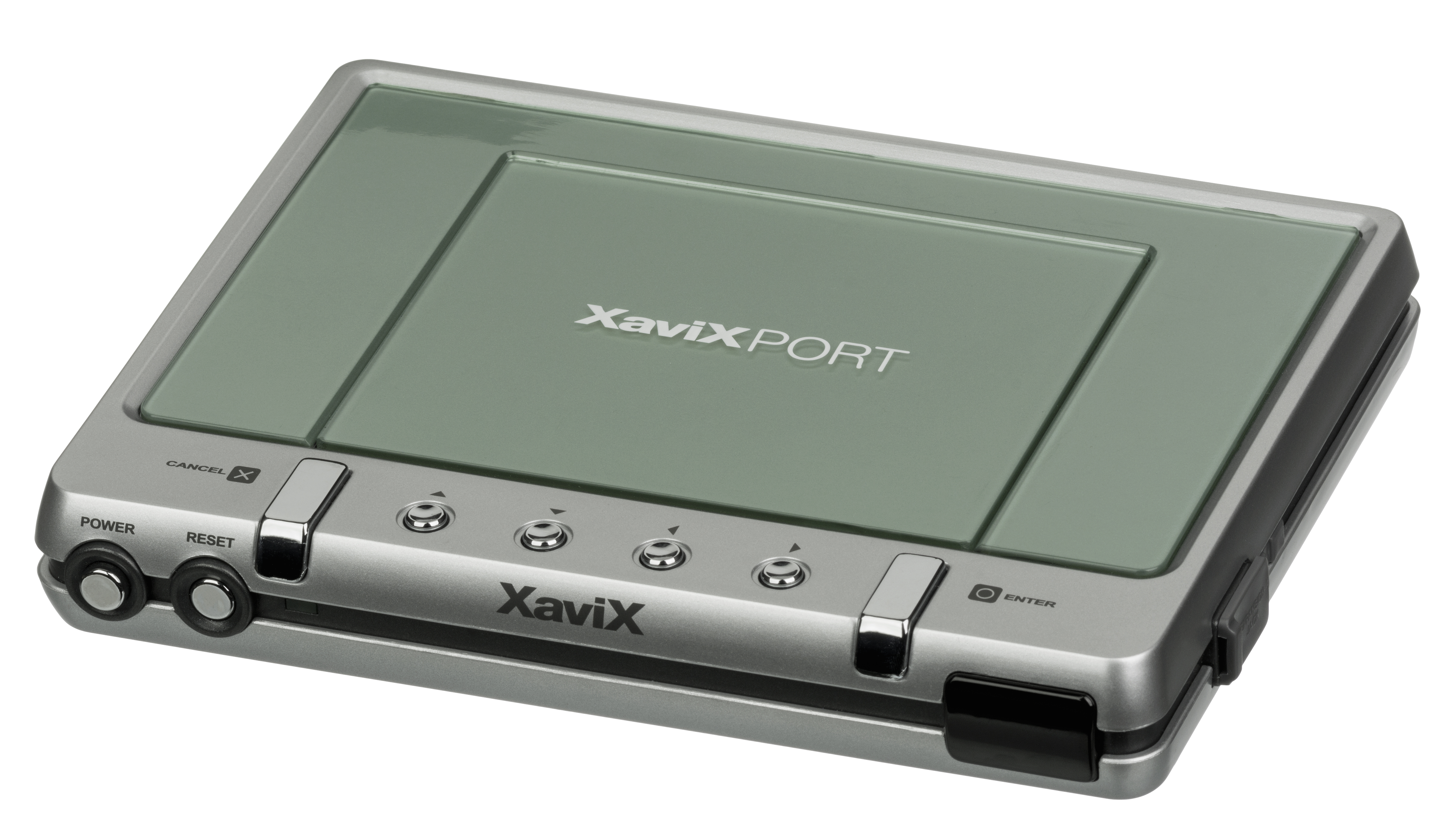
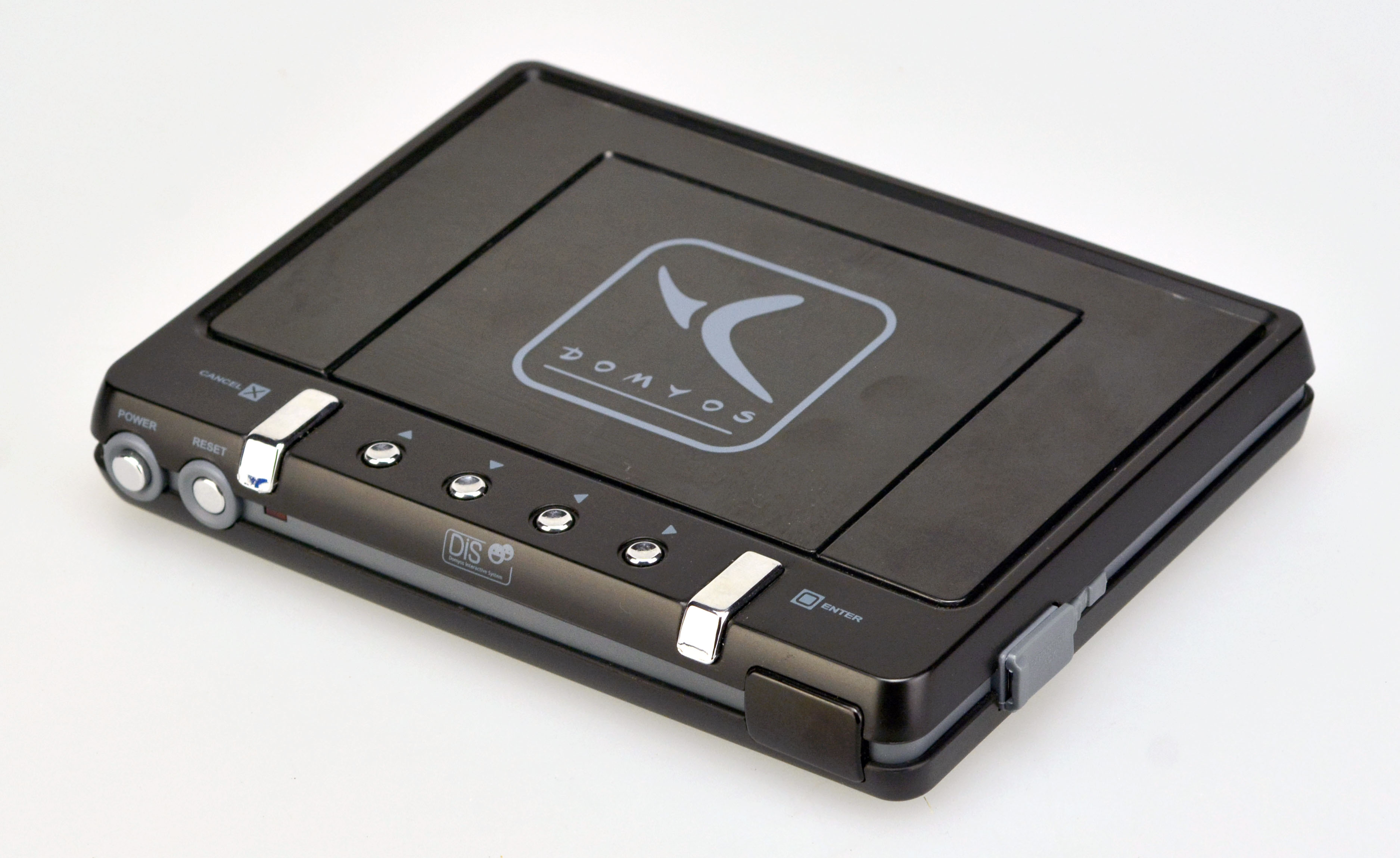
- Top: North American XaviXPORT. Bottom: European Domyos Interactive System.
- Also known as: DIS
- Developer: SSD Company Limited
- Type: Home video game console
- Generation: Sixth
- Released: 2004
- Introductory price: US$79.99
- Discontinued: 2017
- Media: ROM cartridge
- CPU: MOS Technology 6502 or WDC 65C816, depending on game (part of the game cartridge)
- Website: xavixstore.com

The XaviXPORT, sold as the Domyos Interactive System in Europe in Decathlon stores, is a fitness-based home video game console developed by Japanese company SSD Company Limited and released in the United States in 2004 during the sixth generation of video game consoles. The console uses cartridges and wireless controllers. The controllers are shaped like sports equipment (such as baseball bats or tennis rackets), with users' actions represented on the television screen through the use of sensors in the controllers.

The manufacturer's suggested retail price for the XaviXPORT was US$79.99 at launch. However, the system has been officially sold as low as $19.99 bundled with tennis or bowling in their 2013 Spring Cleaning sale. In 2013, Xavix's social media sites went silent, but the ecommerce site remained up until 2017 when the official domain expired.

== Hardware ==
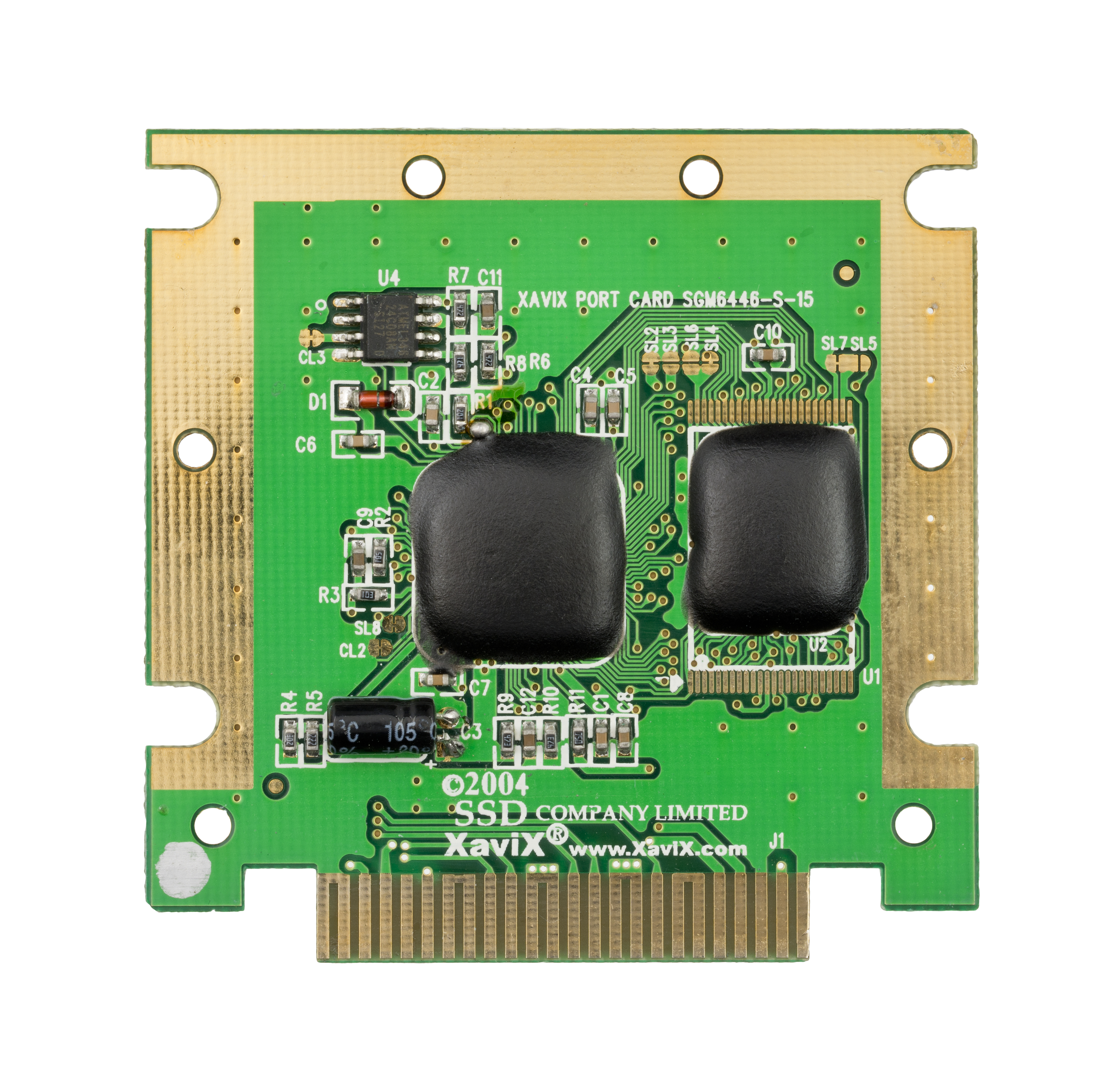
Circuit board of a Xavix game cartridge. Unlike other video game systems, the processor (left COB) is part of the cartridge.

The XaviXPORT was developed by eight engineers who worked on the Nintendo Entertainment System. The processors were built into the games themselves with the more basic games using the same 8-bit 6502 CPU as the NES. More advanced games were released using the 16-bit 65816 CPU, the same CPU on which the Ricoh 5A22, the CPU employed by the Super NES, was based.

== Software ==
Many games released for the system included specific controllers needed for the game to work, while other controllers were compatible with several games. The library of games is mostly shared between Japan and the US, with European releases being mostly exclusive.

There were 23 titles known to have been released. This list is incomplete. Some games are not confirmed to be the same/different between regional releases.

Background shading indicates that the game cartridge has an integrated camera.

#	US Title	Overseas Titles	Accessory/Controller
1	(United States) Baseball	(Japan) XaviX BASEBALL	Baseball bat and Ball
2	(United States) BassFISHING	(Japan) XaviX Bass FISHING	Fishing Rod
3	(United States) Bowling	(Japan) XaviX BOWLING	Bowling Ball
4	(United States) PowerBoxing	(Japan) XaviX POWER BOXING (ザビックスパワーボクシング, Zabikkusupawābokushingu)	Boxing Gloves
5	(United States) Eyehand	(Japan) XaviX EYEHAND (ザビックスアイハンド, Zabikkusuaihando)	2 Glove Sensors
6	(United States) Golf	(Japan) XaviX GOLF (ザビックスゴルフ, Zabikkusugorufu)	Wireless Sensor and 2 Golf Clubs + 3 optional Clubs
7	(United States) Jackie Chan J-Mat Fitness	(Japan) XaviX AEROSTEP	J-Mat (Step Sensor) and two 1-lb Hand Weights
8	(United States) Lifestyle Manager	(Japan) XaviX Beauty Balancer	Electronic Scale and remote.
9	(United States) Music & Circuit	(Japan) XaviX Aerostep M.C. (ザビックスエアロステップミュージックアンドサーキット, Zabikkusuearosuteppumyūjikkuandosākitto)	Music Import System (Headphone Jack adapter) and Step Sensor
10	(United States) Tennis	(Japan) XaviX TENNIS	2 Tennis Rackets
11	N/A	(European Union) Domyos Step Concept	Step Mat and Step 160 or Domyos Mat
12	N/A	(European Union) Domyos Fitness Dance	Step Mat and Step 160 or Domyos Mat and Music Import System (Headphone Jack adapter built into cartridge)
13	N/A	(European Union) Domyos Fitness Adventure	Step Mat and Step 160 or Domyos Mat
14	N/A	(European Union) Domyos Fitness Exercises	Step Mat and Step 160 or Domyos Mat
15	N/A	(European Union) Domyos Fitness Play	4 Reflective Wristbands
16	N/A	(European Union) Domyos Fitness Training	Domyos Training Kit (Barbell)
17	N/A	(European Union) Domyos SoftFitness	2 Glove Sensors
18	N/A	(European Union) Domyos Fit'Race	Bike Concept (Exercise Bike adapter) / VM 480 or VM 740 (Exercise Bikes)
19	N/A	(Japan) Hot Plus	
20	N/A	(Japan) PowerKIDS	
21	N/A	(Japan) PowerKIDS Jr.	
22	N/A	(Japan) Step Slowly	
23	N/A	(Japan) XaviXmobile Brain Club	
