= Chip on board =

Method of circuit board manufacture

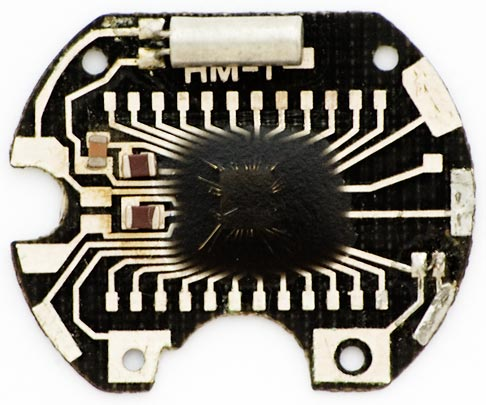
The PCB of a quartz watch. The IC is visible as the square under the black epoxy.

Chip on board (COB) is a method of circuit board manufacturing in which integrated circuits (e.g. microprocessors) are attached (wired, bonded directly) to a printed circuit board, and covered by a blob of epoxy. Chip on board eliminates the packaging of individual semiconductor devices, which allows a completed product to be less costly, lighter, and more compact. In some cases, COB construction improves the operation of radio frequency systems by reducing the inductance and capacitance of integrated circuit leads.

COB effectively merges two levels of electronic packaging: level 1 (components) and level 2 (wiring boards), and may be referred to as "level 1.5".

== Construction ==
A finished semiconductor wafer is cut into dies. Each die is then physically bonded to the PCB. Three different methods are used to connect the terminal pads of the integrated circuit (or other semiconductor device) with the conductive traces of the printed circuit board.

=== Flip chip ===
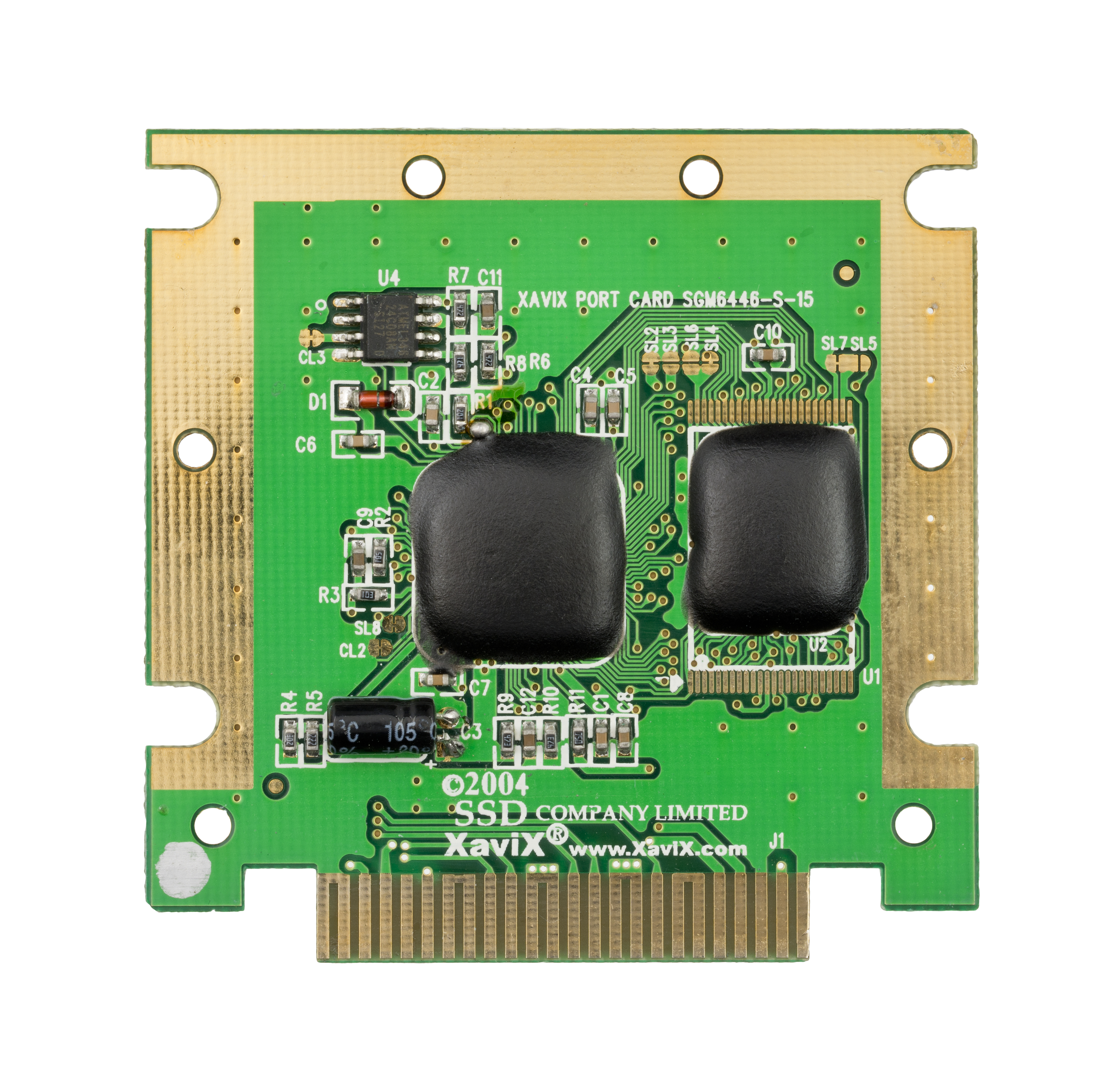
The cartridge board for "Tennis" for the Xavix / XaviXPORT console. Unlike other consoles, the main processor for the system is located on the video game cartridges.

In "flip chip on board", the device is inverted, with the top layer of metallization facing the circuit board. Small balls of solder are placed on the circuit board traces where connections to the chip are required. The chip and board are passed through a reflow soldering process to make the electrical connections.

=== Wire bonding ===
In "wire bonding", the chip is attached to the board with an adhesive. Each pad on the device is connected with a fine wire lead that is welded to the pad and to the circuit board. This is similar to the way that an integrated circuit is connected to its lead frame, but instead the chip is wire-bonded directly to the circuit board.

=== Glob-top ===
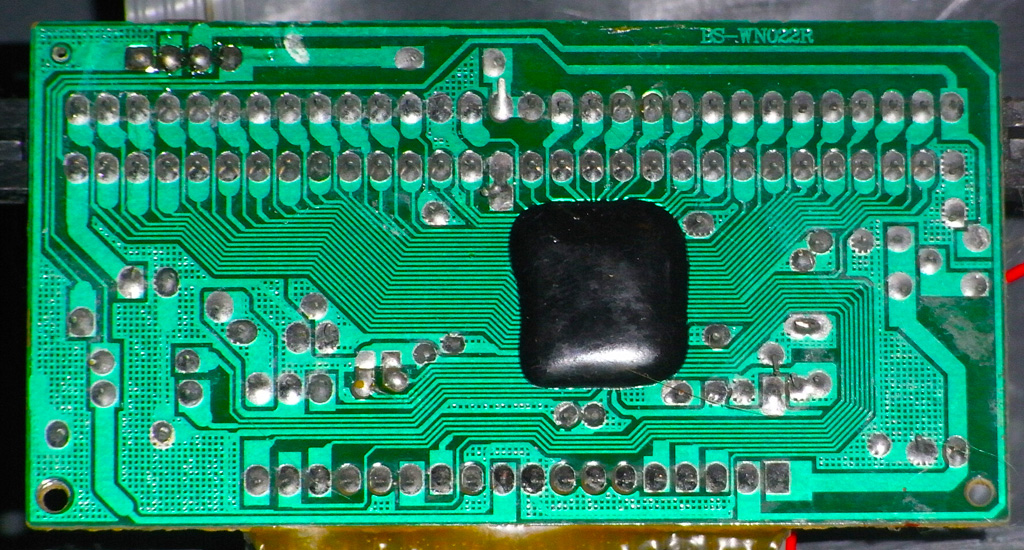
A chip-on-board (COB) covered with dark epoxy

Glob-top is a variant of conformal coating used in chip-on-board assembly (COB). It consists of a drop of specially formulated epoxy or resin deposited over a semiconductor chip and its wire bonds, to provide mechanical support and exclude contaminants such as fingerprint residues which could disrupt circuit operation. It is most commonly used in electronic toys and low-end devices.

=== Flexible circuit board ===
In "tape-automated bonding", thin flat metal tape leads are attached to the semiconductor device pads, then welded to the printed circuit board.

In all cases, the chip and connections are covered with an encapsulant to reduce entry of moisture or corrosive gases to the chip, to protect the wire bonds or tape leads from physical damage, and to help dissipate heat.

The printed circuit board substrate may be assembled into the final product, for example, as in a pocket calculator, or, in the case of a multi-chip module, the module may be inserted in a socket or otherwise attached to yet another circuit board. The substrate wiring board may include heat-dissipating layers where the mounted devices handle significant power, such as in LED lighting or power semiconductors. Or, the substrate may have low-loss properties required at microwave radio frequencies.

== COB LED modules ==
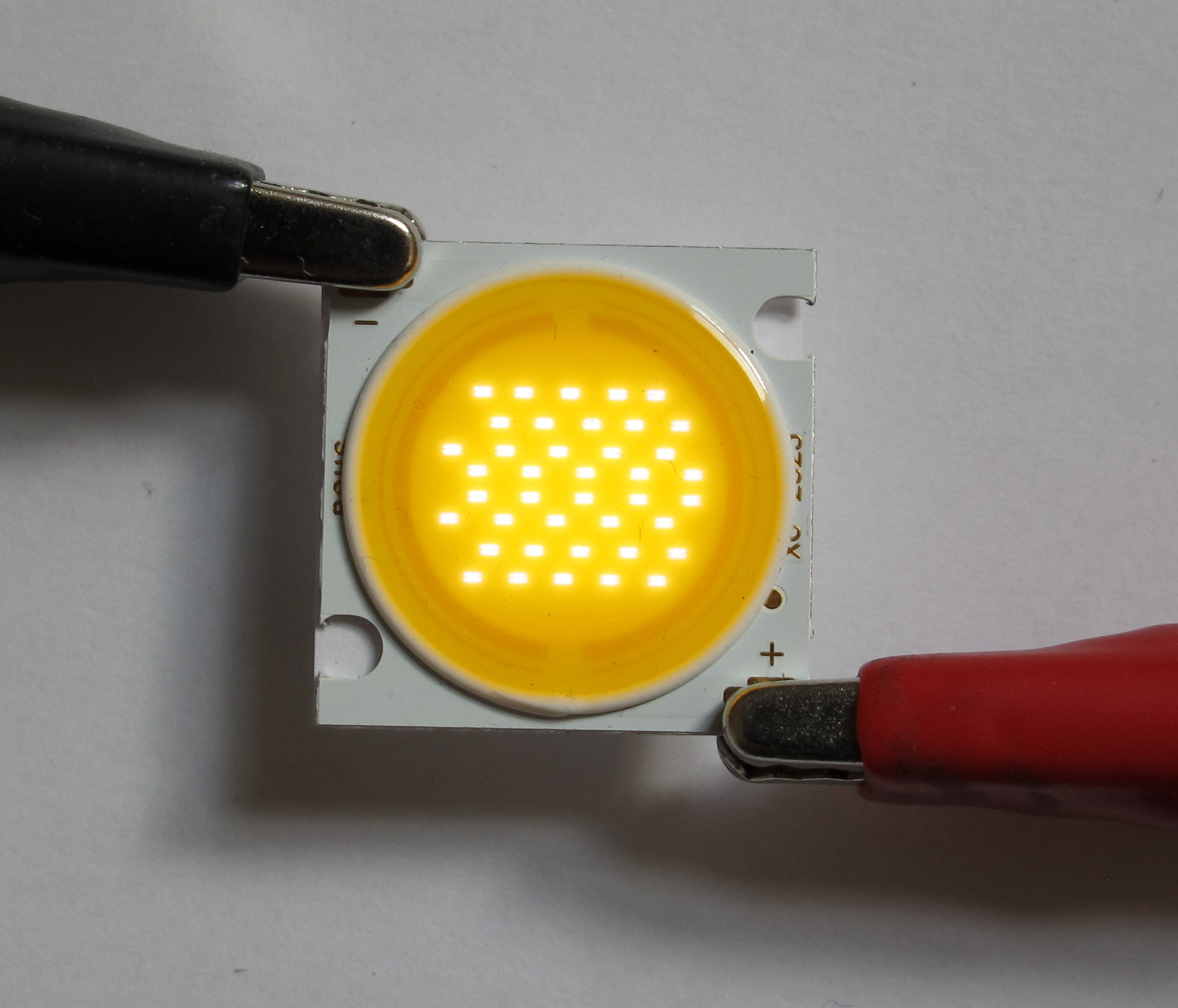
High power COB LEDs supplied at a low current level with 5% of maximum current. Showing 40 single blue power LEDs below the yellow surface

COBs containing arrays of light-emitting diodes have made LED lighting more efficient. LED COBs include a layer of silicone containing yellow Ce:YAG phosphor that encapsulates the LEDs and turns the blue light of the LEDs into white light. The COB is usually built on an aluminum PCB that provides good thermal conductivity to a heatsink. COB LEDs could be compared with multi chip modules or hybrid integrated circuits since all three can incorporate multiple dies into a single unit. COB variants are also used in newer LED bulbs as in this case the substrate can be either glass, sapphire or sometimes regular phenolic.

With a transparent substrate the LED chips may be installed "upside down" shining through for higher outcoupling. Typically they are glued to the substrate with UV setting glue, interconnects attached, and the encapsulant and phosphor applied in a single step with a back reflective coating applied to channel light out of the device.
