= GP32 =

Handheld game console

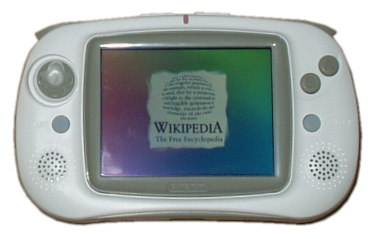
- Manufacturer: Game Park
- Type: Handheld game console
- Generation: Sixth
- Released: SK: November 23, 2001
- Introductory price: ₩179,000
- Discontinued: 2005
- Units shipped: ~32,000
- Media: SmartMedia
- CPU: Samsung S3C2400X01
- Memory: 8 MB of RAM
- Graphics: 320x240
- Camera: None
- Successor: GP2X

The GP32 (GamePark 32) is a ARM-based handheld game console developed by the South Korean company Game Park. It was released on November 23 2001 in South Korea and distributed in some parts of Europe.

== History ==
The GP32 was shown at annual E3 conventions from 1999 to 2002. At one point, GamePark produced an unreleased unit with cellular functionality.

== Features ==
The overall design is not dissimilar to the original version of the Game Boy Advance. The GP32 is based on a 133 MHz ARM 9 CPU and 8 MB of SDRAM. Unlike other handheld gaming systems of the sixth generation, which tend to be proprietary cartridge-based, the GP32 uses SmartMedia cards (SMC) for storing programs and data, making it accessible for amateur developers as no further development hardware is required.

The console has an eight-way microswitch based mini-joystick controller, two main buttons ('A' and 'B'), two shoulder buttons on each side of the SMC slot ('L' and 'R') and two other menu buttons on each side of the screen ('SELECT' and 'START'), made from a softer, translucent rubber. The console also has a USB 1.1 port for connection with a host computer, a serial expansion port, a 3.3 V power adapter input, a headphone connector and a rear compartment that holds two AA-sized batteries.

== Variants ==
There are three main commercial versions of the unit characterized by different display types. Commercial units are white in color with either grey or white buttons and trim. There are also a number of differently colored promotional units and several prototype units with different designs.

=== GP32 NLU ===
The original GP32 relied on an external light source to view the screen. This became known as the no-light unit (NLU) to distinguish it from later variants.

=== GP32 FLU ===
In late 2002, Game Park introduced the frontlight unit (FLU) as a factory-modified (by Hahotech) version of the NLU. It provides its own illumination via a transparent panel between the LCD and the plastic screen cover. The extra hardware resulted in a slightly raised display frame when compared to the NLU and BLU variants. The front light could be turned off with a switch mounted on the back of the GP32 case (to save battery). The GP32 FLU's name was derived from a sticker added to the front of the GP32 packaging differentiating it from the standard non-light versions.

=== GP32 BLU ===
In mid-2004, Game Park introduced the backlight unit (BLU). The new BLU LCD was compatible with the NLU (and FLU) and provided a superior screen display in poor lighting conditions. At the end of 2004, Game Park also released a second version of the BLU, which had a different LCD from the first version of BLU units. The new BLU+ LCD was not 100% compatible with the original LCD screen and so software required special handling to support both LCD versions. The backlight could be disabled by holding the SELECT button for 5 seconds. The BLU models also had a slightly different USB port connector and better quality micro switches for the controller.

== Software ==
=== Built In ===
The original Game Park firmware had three main functions: to launch applications, provide a means of linking to a host computer and play music in MP3 format. Later versions of the Game Park firmware removed the MP3 music capability.

=== Homebrew ===
Game Park planned their system to be powerful and useful, but they also wanted users to be able to create homebrew software. GP32 users could register the unit on the official website and get a free suite of development tools to create their own programs. Game Park also allowed (under certain restrictions) the publishing of such homebrew games on their website. The GP32's original firmware only supported running encrypted games and tools. Users had to register and use an encrypted "Free Launcher" to run unsigned software. Alternative firmware removed the necessity of using the "Free Launcher" software and provided many extra functions that were lacking in the original firmware.

Through this strategy, the GP32 was the host of multiple homebrew applications and games. The various applications made for it ranged from alternative firmware, file managers, games, emulators, game generators (such as RPG Maker), a DivX player and image slideshows.

=== Commercial ===
Commercial games could be acquired via internet download (encrypted to the GP32's ID) or in a retail box. The retail boxes contained SmartMedia Cards with the games which were encrypted to run only from these cards (SMC ID). They could alternatively be downloaded from a Korean portal after submitting the GP32's ID, they were then encrypted to run only on that GP32. Downloading the games effectively reduced the cost to the consumer, who was no longer paying for the manufacture of the cartridge. Downloading a game online could range from US$10 to US$30.

=== Games ===
Five games in a variety of genres were released at the system's launch on November 23, 2001. About 28 commercial games were eventually released. The last commercial game to be released was the platformer/RPG Blue Angelo, which was released on December 16, 2004. Most commercial GP32 games could be bought either as a boxed physical copy or as a digital download through Gamepark's online JoyGP store (typically for a much lower price). JoyGP was the international version of the MegaGP store, which existed earlier and was limited to South Korea. Although most games were sold in both formats, there were a few exceptions: for example, "Blue Angelo" was (and is) only sold as a boxed copy made in France, and "Gloop Deluxe" was only sold online, but not through JoyGP.

Although the number of official games available for the GP32 system is limited, many open source/free software developers worked on various emulators and ported PC games. In addition to this, a wide range of free, public domain games were created by amateur developers. Game Park did not ask any royalties to release games for its device, which made it easier for small editors or independent developers to release software for the GP32.

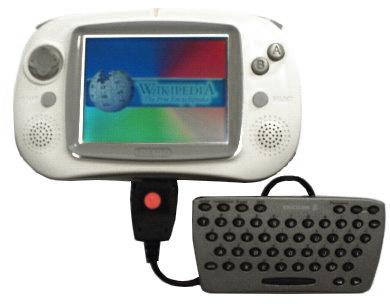
GP32 with an Ericsson Chatboard

The modification of Ericsson Chatboard micro-keyboards to work with the system has seen a new flourish of software development, including countless attempts at ports of Linux, and keyboard support being added to many emulators.

=== Emulators ===
The GP32's relatively powerful ARM 920T CPU and freely available 'C'-based SDK have allowed many emulators to be specifically developed or ported from other platforms. Emulated systems that run on the GP32 include 16-bit era and earlier console and computer platforms. These emulators allow users to experience a large variety of games on their GP32 system, largely compensating for the relatively small library of commercially available games. There is also a Windows-based GP32 emulator, which allows users to run GP32 software on a Windows-based PC.

== Commercial availability ==
Commercially, the system can be found mostly in Korea, and some other parts of Asia. Although an initial European release was abandoned, the GP32 BLU model was released in three European markets, including Portugal, Spain, and Italy, being distributed by Virgin Play on June 15, 2004, with a price point of €199. There were official distributors in the United Kingdom and Sweden as well. Game Park, however, did not release the console in America.

Despite not being released worldwide, the GP32 has a large international community of users and developers. About 32,000 or 30,000 units were sold by the end of 2007.

== Hardware ==
Dimensions	147 by 88 by 34 millimetres (5.8 in × 3.5 in × 1.3 in)
Weight	0.163 kilograms (0.36 lb)
Display	3.5 inches (89 mm) TFT, 16-bit colour, 320 × 240 pixels
CPU	Samsung S3C2400X01 (ARM920T core), 20 (and under) to 133 MHz (overclockable to 166 MHz+ in some cases. Some have even reached 256 MHz (not always stable, low battery life). Overclocking ability is random, however, all GP32s were supposed to reach 133 MHz. A few early "bad" units maxed out at 132 MHz.)
RAM	8 MB SDRAM (16-bit wide)
ROM	512 KB (8-bit wide)
Sound	44.1 kHz 16-bit stereo sound four-channels and up software WAV mixing (it is up to the coder, but four-channel is built into the official SDK); 16-part polyphonic software MIDI (in official SDK); Earphone port Stereo speakers
Storage	SmartMedia 2–128 MB 3.3v
Power Supply	2 × AA batteries or 3-V DC adapter. Batteries last between 6 and 12+ hours, but the actual amount depends on a number of factors.
Wireless	GP Link was a wireless dongle that could be inserted into the external socket. It allowed users to chat and play online games. Up to four wireless units could be connected at once within 10m. Frequencies were reported to be 300 MHz. The games supported for multiplayer were Little Wizard, Dungeon & Guarder, Treasure Island, and Rally Pop.

== Successors ==
- GP2X - dual-CPU unit produced by new company GamePark Holdings.
- GP2X Wiz - Successor to the GP2X
- GP2X Caanoo - Successor to the GP2X Wiz
- XGP - a never-released system developed by Game Park

== See also ==
- Comparison of handheld game consoles
