= Game Park =

South Korean electronics company

- Founded: 1996; South Korea
- Defunct: March 2007
- Fate: Closed, due to bankruptcy
- Headquarters: South Korea

Game Park (Korean: 게임파크) was a South Korean company that was founded in 1996 and went bankrupt in March 2007. It is responsible for creating the GP32 and the never-released XGP. GamePark Holdings was founded by former employees of Game Park in 2005.

== Foundation ==
Founded in 1996 in South Korea, Game Park entered the industry using government money. At the time, games in Korea were only made for PCs and Arcade. There was a law established after World War II that forbid importation of Japanese electronics. Some clones of Japanese consoles such as the Sega Saturn (cloned by Samsung) and Nintendo 64 (cloned by Hyundai) were holders of minor market shares. In a place where most games ran on the PC, a small place resided for video game consoles. To make changes, the South Korean government decided to fund a company that would create a console to compete against the monopolized Japanese market. A contest was held and Game Park was the winning company. Game Park was set to create the first portable video game system from Korea.

The GP32 (Game Park 32-bit), their first system, was then being designed. Several iterations of it were developed, including a metallic look, and a style issued from the original Game Boy design, and a flat panel with a screen on the upper part and buttons on the lower part. Those systems were shown at the 2000 Tokyo Game Show but failed to catch attention with their inferior hardware and games. After five years of development, Game Park opted for a more plastic look, a lot like the Game Boy Advance. Game Park's new handheld also had a major internal hardware upgrade making it more powerful than the GBA.

== Launch ==
The GP32 originally launched in November 2001, in Korea exclusively. Game Park had opted for a narrow-area market approach so they could better handle the production costs. The result was small success in Korea.

Game Park did make an error: paying a large amount of money to port PlayStation games to their consoles. The porting was handled by Korean developers which had never seen a PlayStation before because of its interdiction in Korea. It was very difficult for them to import games and it ended up that only one ported game was made, Princess Maker 2, a simulation so complicated it was never translated. One had to speak Japanese to play it well.

Initially, the GP32 launched with a 3.5 inch screen, 2 buttons, 2 shoulder buttons, 2 function buttons and 2 integrated speakers for stereo sound. It is almost physically the same as the GBA except for a bigger screen, higher-quality speakers and more ergonomic handling.

== Surprising market ==
Though the GP32 was planned to be a gaming console, its game selection was not sufficient in quality or quantity to truly compete against the Game Boy Advance. One of its advantage was that in Korea no Japanese electronics were allowed, the Game Boy Advance included. On January 1, 2002, however, Korea finally allowed imports of Japanese electronics. The system's success hinged on being an open source handheld attractive to independent developers and capable of supporting video and audio playback.

== GP32 Variants ==
=== GP32 FLU ===
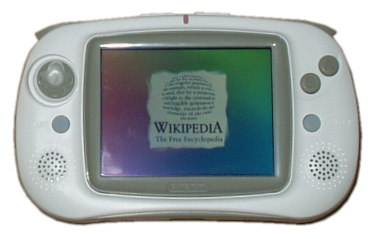
Game Park's most famous product - the GP32

The GP32 FLU, (Front Lit Unit) is a GP32 which has been modified to include a front light, much like the Game Boy Advance SP. The big difference, however, is that the GP32 FLU has exactly the same mold, buttons, etc. as the GP32, unlike the completely redesigned Game Boy Advance SP. This reduced the cost of the modification. This system was released in Korea exclusively again, in 2002.

The front light can be switched off to save battery power.

=== GP32 BLU ===
The GP32 BLU (standing for Back Lit Unit) was another iteration of the GP32 (the equivalent of the brighter GBA SP), again having nothing changed in appearance, except for a now back lit screen, much better than the FLU. The BLU gave players a very bright and colorful screen. This unit was introduced in 2004, and later that year they even released it in Italy, France, United Kingdom, and Spain.

A problem is that without the back light the screen looks very dark and it's hard to see the image, so the backlight must run continuously except when it's not necessary to look at the screen (for example, when using the console as an MP3 player).

== Imports ==
The system has been subject to much importation, due largely to the fact the operating system on it features both Korean and English support, even though it was exclusively sold in Korea for many years.

== Competition ==
In 2003, the Game Park line still was not released in Europe or North America.

Team17, the developer of Worms, offered to port their games directly on the GP32 for free. Although most companies demanded financial support, Team17 only asked for two GP32 units to test their games. Game Park refused, for currently unknown reasons.

In July 2003, GP32News, a French news web site for the GP32 took a personal initiative to show and publicize the GP32 at the Japan Expo in France. Game Park refused to fund the site, which would have helped give the GP32 a publicity boost.

At the Game Convention event in Germany in August, the GP32 was announced with a European launch for Holiday 2003. Numerous distributors, to sell the system, as well as the first editors of European games to start development were contacted.

The company in charge of distributing the GP32, Mitsui (a well-known company in Japan) abandoned Game Park for a bigger company, Sony. Mitsui then was in charge of distributing the Sony PSP in Europe, after having no communication from Game Park.

== Today ==
The GP32 knew a small success in Europe. North America never saw the GP32. The GP32 was sold in the Americas through web stores but has become increasingly rare.

In early 2005, there was an internal disagreement in Game Park about where to take the company. Some former employees split off to form GamePark Holdings, which successfully released the GP2X handheld console in November 2005 and released the GP2X Wiz in April 2009.

In 2006, the original Game Park officially announced the XGP, the successor to their GP32. They also announced the XGP-Mini, a smaller version of the XGP with half the RAM. Later on, they announced the XGP-Kids, a redesign of the GP32, featuring the same hardware at a lower price for younger players.

None of these consoles were actually released, and in March 2007 Game Park filed for bankruptcy. Gamepark's official website is currently unavailable and was previously replaced by a website for a shoe store before it was taken down
