= GPD Win Mini =

Handheld Windows 10 gaming computer

- Manufacturer: GamePad Digital (GPD)
- Type: Handheld game console / Ultra-mobile PC
- Released: July 2023; 3 years ago
- Operating system: Windows 10 Home
- CPU: AMD Ryzen
- Memory: 16–64 GiB RAM
- Storage: 512 GiB–2 TiB SSD (replaceable) MicroSD card slot
- Display: 7" 1920x1080, 16:9 10-point touch screen
- Graphics: Radeon 760M/780M
- Controller input: D-pad; 4 face buttons 6 shoulder buttons 2 analog sticks
- Connectivity: Wi-Fi 6 802.11a/b/g/n/ac/ax (2.4/5GHz), Bluetooth 5.2, USB4, USB-C 3.2, OCuLink/USB 3.0 Type A, 3.5mm audio
- Dimensions: 168 x 109 x 26 mm
- Weight: 520 g
- Predecessor: GPD Win 2
- Related: GPD Pocket 3, GPD Win 4, GPD Win Max 2
- Website: www.gpd.hk (English) www.softwincn.com (中文)

The GPD Win Mini is a Windows-based palmtop computer that is the successor to the GPD Win series. It is manufactured by Chinese company GamePad Digital and was crowdfunded. Announced in first-quarter 2023, the crowdfunding campaign officially kicked off on 2023, and it was released in July 2023.

== History ==
GamePad Digital released the GPD Win in October 2016. This was meant to be an answer to the lack of x86 Windows-based mobile gaming devices. The Win met with success, surpassing its target funding. Building upon this success, they announced the GPD Win 2 in 2017. By December 2017, tech media outlets such as TechRadar, The Verge, Slash Gear, ExtremeTech, and more were providing write ups and technical specs of pre-production units. Continuing on this success, GPD experimented with PSP format in Win 3 and Win 4 before returning to the clamshell with Win Mini.

The Indiegogo campaign for the Win Mini was a success, and surpassed its stated $100,000 goal by roughly 1800% at ~$1 million with over 1,000 pre-order backers. By the end of the campaign, the project received nearly $1.3 million of backing.

== Software ==
Like its predecessors, the GPD Win Mini runs 64-bit Windows Home. The system is also capable of running Linux operating systems. It has Vulkan, DirectX 12, and OpenGL 4.4 support.

== Design ==
The Win Mini frame is made of magnesium alloy. The main shell is made of ABS to reduce weight. It has an 80-key QWERTY keyboard that extends across the body of the device.

The game controller has the same dual analog sticks, D-pad, and ABXY buttons flanking the face of the device, moved outward from their position on the GPD Win 2 to allow room for a trackpad in the center. The shoulders have the standard L1/R1 buttons, however the L2/R2 buttons from Win 2 have been replaced with analog triggers protruding down the bottom. The L3/R3 buttons have been moved from the back shoulders into the joysticks. Dual linear motors are included, one on each side. L4/R4 buttons have been added above the keyboard. The back top of the device has various I/O ports: USB4, USB-C (3.2), OCuLink or USB-A (3.0), MicroSD card slot, and 3.5 mm audio, along with cooling fan exhaust grates. An NVMe 2230 M.2 SSD slot is present inside, underneath the bottom cover. The GPD Win Mini has dual speakers on either side the face just outward under each analog stick. The screen has been increased from 6" to 7", and is an H-IPS capacitive 10-point touch screen that is reinforced with Gorilla Glass 4.

== Technical specifications ==
To facilitate the desired improved performance over the Win 2, Win 4, and Win Max 2, GamePad Digital upgraded the original model's Intel Core M CPU to an AMD Ryzen 7640U APU, with a base clock speed of 3.5 GHz, and a max of 4.9 GHz with Boost. This gives a single and multi-core performance with four and two times the benchmark points respectively, as the Intel Core M3-7Y30/8100Y CPU found in the Win 2. The third generation AMD RDNA integrated GPU has 512:32:16:8 core config, up from the HD Graphics 615 192:24:3 config in the Win 2, and has a max dynamic frequency of 2.6 GHz, up from 900 MHz on the Win 2.

The cooling system for the Win Mini was overhauled to meet the needs of the upgraded APU, the Ryzen's thermal design point having nearly doubled, up to 22 Watts. It contains an auto controlled fan and a heat sink. GamePad Digital has changed the motherboard design to accommodate the upgrades.

The RAM has been doubled from 8 GiB up to 16 GiB of LPDDR5, the same memory type as the Win 4. Foregoing the SATA-based M.2 storage of the Win 2, the Win Mini has a NVMe M.2 2230 solid state drive. The drive is also user-replaceable, with no capacity ceiling. The PCIe4 x4 M.2 slot has a max theoretical transfer speed of nearly 8 GiB/s. GamePad Digital also has retained the MicroSD slot due to popular demand, also having no capacity ceiling.

In addition to the larger display, the touch screen increases to 1920x1080 resolution from its predecessor; however, the device is still 4K capable, and supports wireless display options. The max supported resolution using the DP 1.4 and HDMI 2.0 protocols is 7680x4320 at 60 Hz refresh rate. The device also supports Miracast wireless display technology.

The Win Mini has a polymer lithium battery with 7.6 V output, 44.24 Wh of power, and 600 Wh/L energy density. This is a claimed 49% increase of battery capacity over the GPD Win 2. The battery has been rated for a maximum of 8 hours of gameplay battery life at lowest settings.

Category	Specification					
Launch date	2023		2024		2025	
Dimensions	168 by 109 by 26 millimetres (6.6 in × 4.3 in × 1.0 in) 520 grams (1.15 lb)				172 by 109 by 26 millimetres (6.8 in × 4.3 in × 1.0 in) 555 grams (1.224 lb)	
CPU	AMD Ryzen 5 7640U (3.5 / 4.9 GHz boost)	AMD Ryzen 7 7840U (3.3 / 5.1 GHz boost)	AMD Ryzen 5 8640U (3.5 / 4.9 GHz boost)	AMD Ryzen 7 8840U (3.3 / 5.1 GHz boost)	AMD Ryzen AI 9 365 (2 / 5 GHz boost)	AMD Ryzen AI 9 HX 370 (2 / 5.1 GHz boost)
CPU	15-22W TDP				6-35W TDP	
Graphics	Radeon 760M (512:32:16:8)	Radeon 780M (768:48:24:12)	Radeon 760M	Radeon 780M	Radeon 880M	Radeon 890M
Memory	LPDDR5 6400					
Memory	16 GiB	32 / 64 GiB	16 GiB	32 / 64 GiB	16 GiB	32 / 64 GiB
Storage	PCIe4 x4 M-key M.2 2230 NVMe				PCIe4 x4 M-key M.2 2280 NVMe	
Storage	512 GiB	512 GiB or 2 TiB	512 GiB	512 GiB or 2 TiB	1 TiB	2 TiB
Storage	MicroSD A2 removable storage No capacity ceilings					
Display	7" 1920x1080, H-IPS 10-point touch screen 4K video support (4096x2304x24 max) on USB-C; Miracast and WiDi support		7" 1920x1080, VRR 10-point touch screen 4K video support (4096x2304x24 max) on USB-C; Miracast, and WiDi support			
Audio	Dual speakers 3.5mm audio Internal microphone Realtek audio driver					
Keyboard	80-button, 6-row QWERTY keyboard					
Game controls	D-pad; 4 face ABXY buttons 2 shoulder L1/R1 buttons 2 analog L2/R2 triggers 2 analog sticks with L3/R3 buttons 2 L4/R4 buttons above keyboard 2 linear vibration motors gyroscope					
Slots	A2 microSD slot M-key M.2 PCIe4 x4					
Ports	USB4, USB 3.1 Type C OCuLink; 3.5 mm 4 pin headphone/mic audio		USB4, USB 3.1 Type C USB 3.0 Type A 3.5 mm 4 pin headphone/mic audio			
Battery	44.24 Wh lithium polymer battery USB-PD charging					
Connectivity	WiFi 6 802.11 a/b/g/n/ac/ax 2.4 GHz / 5 GHz dual-band (2402 Mb/s max rate); Bluetooth 5.2					
Software	Windows 11 Home; Vulkan; DirectX 12; OpenGL 4.4; Linux (unofficial)					

== Performance ==
The GPD Win Mini has been tested to run various modern games on medium to high settings. Forza Horizon 5 has run at 89 FPS on 28 W. Shadow of the Tomb Raider runs at 74 FPS, and Call of Duty Modern Warfare III runs at an average of 57 FPS. Aside from improved frame rates than its predecessor, game loading times have also decreased considerably.

== Release and reception ==
GamePad Digital started shipping units to pre-order backers in May 2023. YouTuber Retro Game Corps reviewed a pre-release version in October 2023. He spoke positively on the size and weight, comparing it to other contemporary devices such as GPD Win 4, ASUS ROG Ally, and Steam Deck. Also saying that the form factor has little to no competition, mostly from other GPD devices. He praised the ease of access of making controller configuration changes to support games without controller support. The ambient heat is distracting at 13W and uncomfortable beyond 15W. As far as performance, he noted that overall power draw was higher than systems with similar CPU configuration, and that newer games will still have stutter, and mediocre frame rates. Older games are generally fine. He did note an increase in emulation performance, testing games like Zelda: Breath of the Wild in CEMU and Ridge Racer 3D in RPCS3.

== See also ==
- Comparison of handheld game consoles
- GPD Win 2
- GPD Win Max
- PC gaming
- Handheld game console
