= GPD Win 3 =

Handheld Windows gaming computer

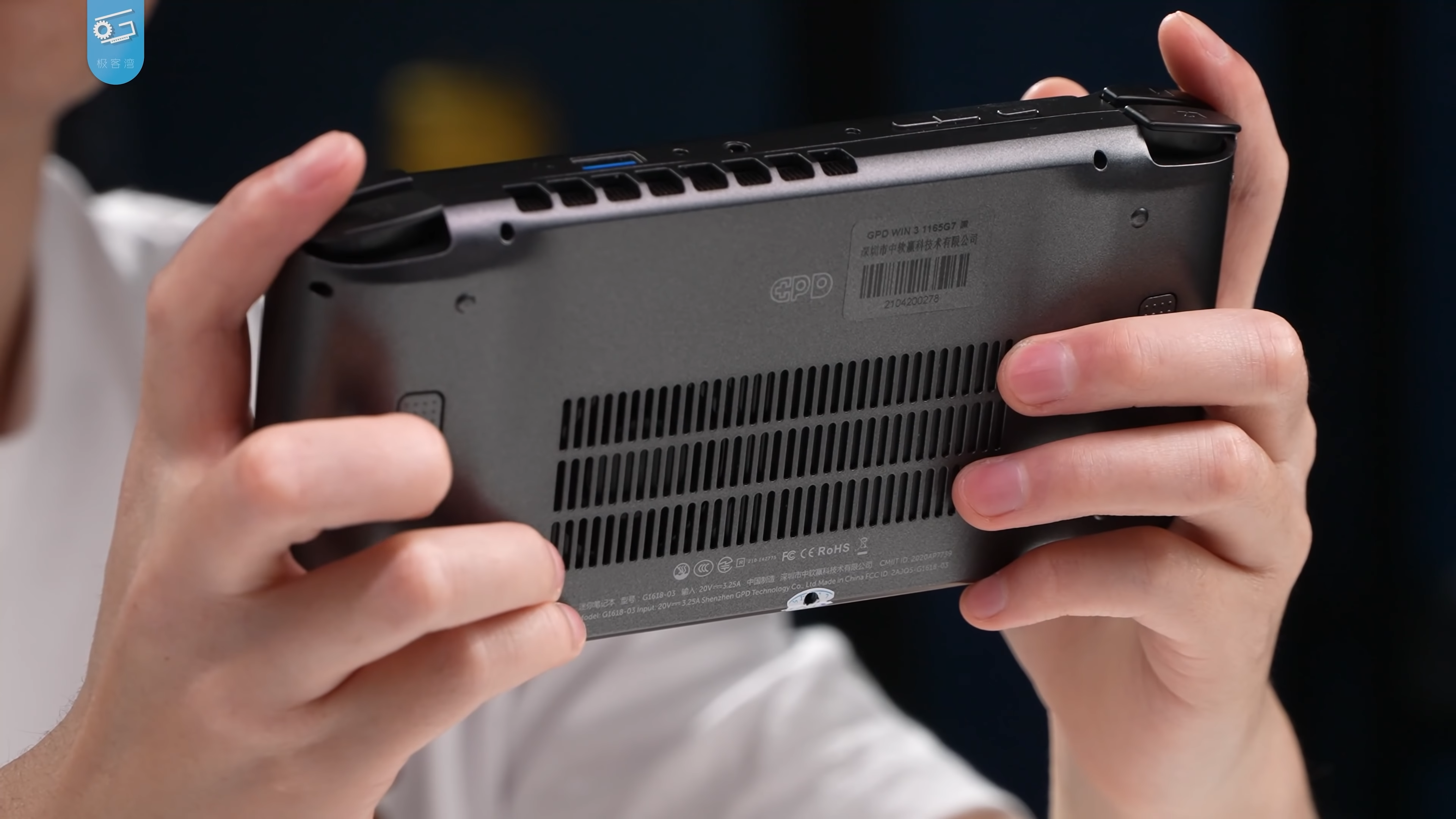
- Manufacturer: GamePad Digital (GPD)
- Product family: GPD Win
- Type: Handheld game console / Ultra-mobile PC / Palmtop
- Released: January 2021; 5 years ago
- Operating system: Windows 10/11 Home
- CPU: Intel Core i5-1135G7, Intel Core i7-1165G7, Intel Core i7-1195G7
- Memory: 16GB LPDDR4x 4266 RAM
- Storage: 3053GB SSD (replaceable)
- Removable storage: MicroSDXC
- Display: 5.5 inches, 1280×720, 16:9 10-point touch screen
- Graphics: Intel Gen 12 Iris Xe Plus Graphics
- Controller input
- Touchpad: 3-point, one button
- Connectivity: Wi-Fi 6, Bluetooth 5.0, Type-A (USB 5Gbps), USB-C (Thunderbolt 4), HDMI, 3.5mm Headphone/Microphone
- Power: 3 × 5000 mAh / 57 Wh
- Dimensions: 198 mm × 92 mm × 27 mm (7.8 in × 3.6 in × 1.1 in)
- Weight: 560 g (1.23 lbs)
- Predecessor: GPD Win 2, GPD Win Max
- Successor: GPD Win 4
- Related: GPD Pocket, GPD XD, GPD Win
- Website: www.gpd.hk (English) www.softwincn.com (中文)

The GPD Win 3 is a Windows-based palmtop computer that is the successor to the GPD Win 2 and GPD Win MAX. It is manufactured by Chinese company GamePad Digital (GPD) and was crowdfunded.

== History ==
Following the GPD Win 2 in 2017 and GPD Win Max in 2020, GPD announced the GPD Win 3.

The Indiegogo campaign started in January 2021 and ended in March 2021.

== Performance ==
The GPD Win 3 can run Fallout 4 at 720p60 or 1080p30 with Ultra settings.

The I7-1165G7 (28W) have same performance as I7-8700H in multi-thread and 20-45% better performance in single thread.

== Specifications ==
Category	Specification	
Version	Standard Version	Advanced Version
Launch date	2021	
Price	$799	$899
Dimensions	198 by 92 by 27 millimetres (7.8 in × 3.6 in × 1.1 in), 560 grams (1.23 lb)	
CPU	Intel Core I5-1135G7 (2.40 GHz/4.20 GHz max)	Intel Core I7-1165G7 (2.80 GHz/4.70 GHz max); Intel Core I7-1195G7 (2.90 GHz/5.00 GHz max)
CPU	TDP 15-28W	
CPU	Intel Tiger lake U	
GPU	Intel Gen12 Iris Xe Graphics	
GPU	Intel Iris Xe Graphics G7 80EUs	Intel Iris Xe Graphics G7 96EUs
Memory	16GB LPDDR4x 4266 (86 GB/s Memory Bandwidth)	
Storage	1TB 2280 M.2 NVMe 1.4; MicroSD A2 removable storage No capacity ceilings	
Display	5.5-inch, 1280x720, H-IPS 10-point touch screen, 16:9 ratio, 268ppi NTSC: 84%, Corning's Fifth-generation Gorilla Glass 4K video support (4096x2304x24 max); Miracast and WiDi support	
Audio	Dual speakers 3.5mm headphone jack Internal microphone Realtek audio driver	
Keyboard	QWERTY keyboard, White Backlit Touch Keyboard; Fingerprint scanner	
Game controls	D-pad 4 face buttons, 6 shoulder buttons ALPS Dual 3D Joysticks; Linear Analog Trigger Button; Dual vibration motors	
Slots	Single microSD slot compatible A2 standard (Up to 160 MB/s max)	
Ports	USB Type-C (Thunderbolt 4 and USB Power Delivery); USB Type-A (USB 5Gbps) (three additional USB 5Gbps ports with Dock station); Micro HDMI (Full HDMI with Dock station); Ethernet port 10/100/1000 Mbit/s (With Dock station); 3.5mm headphone jack	
Battery	3x5000mAh capacity in series lithium polymer battery 65W power adapter (1.5 hours for a full charge)	
Connectivity	Wi-Fi 6 (2402 Mbit/s max rate), MU-MIMO; Bluetooth 5.0	
Software	Windows 10 Home; DirectX 12 Ultimate; Vulkan 1.2; OpenGL 4.6; GNU/Linux (unofficial)	

== See also ==
- Comparison of handheld game consoles
- GPD Win
- GPD Win 2
- GPD XD
- PC gaming
- Handheld game console
