= List of handheld game consoles =

The list of handheld game consoles documents notable handheld game consoles released as commercial products. Handheld game consoles are portable video game consoles with a built-in screen and game controls and the ability to play multiple and separate video games. It does not include PDAs, smartphones, or tablet computers; while those devices are often capable of playing games, they are not generally classified as video game consoles. This is not a complete list; it only lists handheld game consoles with its own Wikipedia article and a source verifying its classification as a handheld console. Currently there are 57 entries in this list, 4 consoles were canceled. (Note: This number is always up to date by this script.)

== List ==
Name	Image	Notes	Release year	Units sold	Ref.
Microvision (Milton Bradley Company)		The very first handheld game console that used interchangeable cartridges.; Plays monochrome games from ROM cartridges.; Cartridges also contained the individual processor and buttons required to play game.; Roughly 10–12 games were released.; Considered a commercial failure, but a creative success that paved the way for the Game Boy's later success.	1979		
Entex Select-A-Game		Dual set of input buttons above and below screen allowed for two player play on same console.; Plays monochrome games from ROM cartridges.; Only 6 games released.	1981		
Entex Adventure Vision		Plays (red) monochrome games from ROM cartridges; Only 4 games released.; Considered a commercial failure.	1982	50,000	
Palmtex Portable Videogame System		Only 3 games released.; Plays cartridges containing a colored sprite overlay, using a monochrome LCD on top of the overlay to cover/uncover each sprite during gameplay	1984		
Digi Casse		Game cartridges contained an LCD	1984		
Epoch Game Pocket Computer	Epoch Game Pocket Computer from the front left.	Cartridge based handheld, with additional software built in.; Monochrome display; Battery life of approximately 60+ hours on 4 AA batteries.	1984		
Etch A Sketch Animator 2000		Considered a commercial failure.; Only 3 games released.; Includes built-in drawing functionality with a touch pad and stylus.	1988		
Game Boy (Nintendo)		First of the Game Boy line of handhelds.; Plays monochrome games from ROM cartridges.; Hardware revisions include the smaller Game Boy Pocket in 1996, and color screened Game Boy Color in 1998.; 1,244 games released.; Was the best-selling handheld console until 2010 when it was surpassed by the Nintendo DS.	1989	118,690,000	
Atari Lynx (Atari)		First handheld electronic game with a color LCD, 3.5-inch screen.; Plays ROM cartridges; Hardware revision smaller Atari Lynx II released in 1991.; Less than 100 games released.; Considered a commercial failure.	1989	500,000	
Game Gear (Sega)		Sega's first handheld game console, color screen with backlight.; Plays ROM cartridges; Internally similar to the Master System, could play games with a converter add-on.; Technology more advanced than its competitors, but suffered from short battery life.; Not a commercial failure; outsold many competitors, but sales lagged far behind Game Boy.	1990	11,000,000	
TurboExpress (NEC)		Internally similar to NEC's TurboGrafx-16 home console, directly able to play its games.; Plays ROM cartridges; Technologically advanced for its time, but high price and short battery life plagued its commercial appeal.	1990	1,500,000	
Gamate (Bit Corporation)		Technologically similar to the original Game Boy.; Plays monochrome games on large, credit card sized ROM cartridges.; Hardware revisions were reported, but they were largely cosmetic and trivial.; At least 71 games are known to have been released.; No exact sales figures are known, but it is generally considered to be a commercial failure.	1990		
Game Master (Hartung)		Has a similar physical appearance to a Game Gear.; Technologically far behind the Game Boy, despite Game Boy generally being considered the weakest at the time frame.; Plays monochrome games from ROM cartridges; Considered a commercial failure.	1990		
Watara Supervision		Technologically similar to the Game Boy.; Screen could be tilted relative to controls via flexible connection.; Hardware revision/version that looked very similar to the Game Boy.; Plays monochrome games from ROM cartridges.; Could link to a television via a link cable.; Considered a commercial failure, often cited due to a lack of games.	1992		
Mega Duck (Welback Holdings)		Technologically and physically similar to the Game Boy.; Plays monochrome games from ROM cartridges.; Considered a commercial failure, often cited due to lack of games.	1993		
Nomad (Sega)		Sega's second and last traditional handheld.; Played entire Sega Genesis library and its exact ROM cartridges.; No games specifically made for it, no compatibility for any other Sega platforms.; Suffered from fast battery consumption and launching at a time when Sega trying to support many other platforms concurrently.; Considered a commercial failure.	1995	1,000,000	
Design Master Senshi Mangajukuu		Bandai's touchscreen handheld game console	1995		
Game.com (Tiger Electronics)		First handheld to feature a touchscreen and internet connection.; Plays monochrome games from ROM cartridges.; Hardware revision Game.com Pocket Pro released in 1998.; Considered a commercial failure.	1997	300,000	
Game Boy Color (Nintendo)			1998	118,690,000	
Neo Geo Pocket (SNK)		Part of the Neo Geo family of consoles.; Plays monochrome games from ROM cartridges.; Hardware revision Neo Geo Pocket Color replaces in 1999 due to poor sales.; Considered a commercial failure, and SNK subsequently leaves the hardware business.	1998	2,000,000	
WonderSwan (Bandai)		Created by Game Boy creator Gunpei Yokoi after leaving Nintendo.; Plays monochrome games from ROM cartridges; Hardware revisions of WonderSwan Color released in 2000 and SwanCrystal in 2002.; Considered a commercial failure, especially after the 2001 release of the Game Boy Advance.	1999	3,500,000	
Cybiko		Combination PDA and handheld game console.; Plays digital games via internet download from PC.; More than 430 games and applications produced, all free.; Hardware revision Cybiko Xtreme released in September 2001.	2000	500,000	
Game Boy Advance (Nintendo)		Part of the Game Boy line of handheld consoles.; Backwards compatible with Game Boy and Game Boy Color games.; Plays games from ROM cartridges.; Hardware revision Game Boy Advance SP released in 2003, smaller Game Boy Micro in 2005.; Roughly 1,500 games released.; Considered a commercial success despite its shorter lifespan due to the release of the Nintendo DS in 2004.	2001	81,500,000	
GP32 (Game Park)		Open source hardware handheld released in South Korea.; Plays SmartMedia cards and digital games via internet download.; Most releases for the system were open-source software games and applications.; Few commercial games released, as publishers feared its openness would lead to piracy.; Considered a commercial failure, but credited as influential in the world of open source hardware.	2001	32,000	
P/ECE (AQUAPLUS)		Open source hardware handheld released only in Japan.; Plays digital games downloaded via connecting to a computer with USB-B.; Most releases for the system were open-source software games and applications.; Could interact with select computer games while connected to a computer, mostly visual novels and eroge.	2001		
N-Gage (Nokia)		Combination handheld game console and phone.; Plays MultiMediaCards; Hardware revision N-Gage QD released in 2004.; Considered a critical and commercial failure.	2003	3,000,000	
GameKing		Series of low end handhelds	2003		
Tapwave Zodiac		Combination handheld game console and PDA.; Features a touchscreen with an included stylus and an MP3 player.; Plays digital games via internal memory or SD cards.; Received critical acclaim for its concept, but was a commercial failure, especially after Sony's 2004 release of the PlayStation Portable.	2003	200,000	
Nintendo DS (Nintendo)		Successor to the Game Boy Advance line, first console in the Nintendo DS line.; Feature two separate screens, one of which a touch screen with a stylus.; Hardware revisions include Nintendo DS Lite in 2006, Nintendo DSi in 2008, Nintendo DSi XL in 2009.; All models play DS ROM cartridges; regular DS models compatible with Game Boy Advance games, DSi models dropped GBA support but added limited library of digital download games.; Considered a commercial success; second best-selling handheld of all time behind the Nintendo Switch, and third best-selling console of all time behind the PlayStation 2 and the Nintendo Switch.	2004	154,020,000	
PlayStation Portable (Sony)		Sony's first traditional entry into the handheld console market.; Plays proprietary Universal Media Discs and digital download games via internet.; Minor hardware revisions include PSP-2000 in 2007, PSP-3000 in 2008.; Major hardware revisions include UMD drive-less PSP Go in 2009, wifi-connection-less PSP E1000 in 2011.; Its legacy is mixed; its sales are far more than any other non-Nintendo handheld, but its sales are just over half of its main competitor of the time, the Nintendo DS.	2004	80,000,000	
Gizmondo (Tiger Telematics)		Plays SD cards.; Features camera, GPS, text messaging, and Bluetooth wireless connectivity.; Despite features, technologically well behind main competitors of the time of PlayStation Portable and Nintendo DS.; Had an alternative "Smart Ads" model released concurrently which sold at almost half the price, but required daily streaming advertisements to be watched on the handheld, well before smartphone games popularized the concept.; Considered a severe commercial failure, propelled by a juxtaposition low sales and particularly high promotional spending and investments.	2005	25,000	
GP2X (GamePark Holdings)		Open source hardware handheld released only in South Korea and the UK.; Technologically and physically similar to the PlayStation Portable.; Plays digital games via SD cards and internet download.; In addition to games, features movie, e-book, and photo viewing.; Most releases for the system were open-source software games and applications.	2005	>60,000	
Dingoo A320 (Dingo Digital Technology)		Open source hardware handheld game console with music and video playback functions.; Plays digital distribution games via internet download and mini-SD cards.; Sold with connection accessories to playing on a television.; Limited retail software.	2009		
GP2X Wiz (GamePark Holdings)		Open source hardware handheld game console.; Successor to the GP2X.; Possesses upgrades in screen and button quality, but only minor upgrade in processing power.; Plays digital games via internet download, few retail games.	2009		
Pandora (OpenPandora)		Open source hardware handheld game console.; Combination game console and subnotebook; appearance of a laptop shrunk down to the size of a Nintendo 3DS.; Plays digital games via internet download.; Features a touchscreen, full QWERTY keyboard, and TV-out.	2010		
CAANOO (GamePark Holdings)		Open source hardware handheld game console.; Successor to the GP2X Wiz; Plays digital games via internet download.; Considered a commercial failure.	2010		
Nintendo 3DS (Nintendo)		Successor to the Nintendo DS line, start of the Nintendo 3DS line.; Hardware revisions include the Nintendo 3DS XL, Nintendo 2DS and New Nintendo 3DS.; Uses two separate screens and is capable of projecting stereoscopic 3D effects without use of 3D glasses.; Plays cartridges and digital games via internet download.; Mixed legacy; a commercial success as far as 75 million sold put it among the best selling handhelds, and well above main competitor PlayStation Vita, but a large sales drop from predecessor Nintendo DS, and quickly dropped after its own successor, Nintendo Switch, was released.	2011	75,940,000	
PlayStation Vita (Sony)		Sony's second handheld console, successor to the PlayStation Portable.; Two models launched; a regular one, and one with 3G internet capabilities that was quickly phased out.; Minor hardware revisions model "PCH-2000" released in 2013; Mixed legacy; was a commercial failure, but retained a cult following, and is cited as influential in the successful PlayStation 4 home console released after it.	2011	16,000,000	
Neo Geo X (Tommo)		Part of the Neo Geo line, releases are adaptations of past Neo Geo titles.; Plays games loaded on SD cards, no digital distribution.; Contains HDMI, A/V and control docking ports for connecting to a television.; The publishing and distribution was licensed to Tommo from SNK Playmore.; Considered a commercial failure for both parties; SNK ordered a halt on production after consumer complaints on quality, which in turn hurt Tommo financially. Both parties threatened legal action.	2012		
Game Gadget		Plays a number of licensed Sega games; Linux based handheld	2012	~20,000	
GCW Zero (Game Consoles Worldwide)		Linux-based on open source hardware.; Focus on homebrew and emulation.; Relatively small-scale, niche production funded by Kickstarter.	2013		
Nvidia Shield Portable		Has a physical appearance of an Xbox 360 controller with a 5-inch screen grafted on top of it.; Based on Android operating system.; Supports HDMI connection to television or wireless game streaming from PC.	2012		
GPD XD (GamePad Digital)		Android-based; Plays game downloaded through the Google Play store; Contains joystick and touchscreen	2015		
Arduboy		Open source hardware based on the Arduino hardware platform; The original version was 1.6 mm thick, with the height and width of a credit card; Games published on Arduboy Arcade are free, open source and available to be edited; 'Arduboy FX', an upgraded version, includes a flash memory chip that stores over 250 games on the device itself	2016		
GPD Win (GamePad Digital)		Microsoft Windows-based handheld and PC hybrid.; Has full QWERTY keyboard, joysticks, d-pad, and face-buttons.; Increasingly more powerful hardware iterations called GPD Win 2, GPD Win Max, GPD Win 3, GPD Win 4 and GPD Win Mini.	2016		
Nintendo Switch (Nintendo)		Can be played as a handheld or on a television when put into docking station.; The individual Joy-Con controllers can attach to the main unit or be used separately.; Touchscreen display with 720p resolution, up to 1080p when docked via HDMI port.; Hardware revision in the handheld-only Nintendo Switch Lite in 2019, larger OLED screen model in 2021.; Considered a commercial success; passing 125 million sold by 2023.	2017	154,010,000	
Evercade (Blaze Entertainment)		Plays officially licensed collections of emulated retro video games.; Design similar to original Game Boy Advance, has ability to connect to television with additional HDMI accessory.; Games released through curated collections of games compiled onto a game cartridge.; Supported by companies such as Atari, Namco, and Interplay.	2020		
Analogue Pocket (Analogue)		Plays original game cartridge for Game Boy, Game Boy Color, Game Boy Advance, Game Gear, Neo Geo Pocket, Neo Geo Pocket Color and Atari Lynx games.; Has a 3.5" 1600x1440, 615 ppi Display.; Designed with Analogue OS, an database based operating system; Features Save States with original game cartridges.	2021		
Ayaneo		Handheld Windows gaming PC using AMD Ryzen processors; Various models include Aya Neo (2021), Ayaneo Next (2022) and Ayaneo Air/Ayaneo Air Pro (2022).	2021		
Steam Deck (Valve Corporation)	Steam Deck console.	A handheld console that plays most games in the Steam library.; Ability to run games from other game stores as well – (Epic Games Store, uPlay, etc.); Comes in 3 models; one LCD and two OLED models, all with different storage capacities.; Has 7 inch, 800p touchscreen.; Ability to hook up to PC monitor or television.	2022	≈3,000,000 as of 2023	
Thumby (TinyCircuits)	Thumby	Very small formfactor handheld measuring 1.2 by 0.7 by 0.3 inches (30.5 mm × 17.8 mm × 7.6 mm).; Has a 0.38 by 0.27 inches (9.7 mm × 6.9 mm) black and white OLED display.; Can be mounted on a keychain.; Can play multiplayer games with a link cable.	2022		
Playdate (Panic)		Has physical appearance of the original Game Boy with a crank (used as controller input) attached to right side.; Has a 2.7-inch black and white display.; New games released once per week.; Initial purchase of unit give user access to the first "season" of games (24 total.)	2022		
Ayaneo 2 (Ayaneo)		Handheld Windows gaming PC using AMD Ryzen Zen 3 processors; Has 7-inch IPS, 800p or 1200p touchscreen.; Uses Windows 11 operating system; Has Radeon 680M integrated iGPU	2022		
ROG Ally (Asus)	ROG Ally console		2023		
TECNO Pocket Go (Tecno Mobile)		Handheld Windows gaming PC using AMD Ryzen 7 processor; Uses Windows 11 operating system	2024		
Nintendo Switch 2 (Nintendo)	The Nintendo Switch 2 in portable mode		2025	10,360,000	
ROG Xbox Ally (Microsoft & ASUS)	ROG Xbox Ally X		2025		

== Cancelled ==
This is a list of notable cancelled handheld game consoles.

Name	Image	Notes	Anticipated year of release	Ref
Red Jade		GBA competitor; 3D capable	2002	
MoMA Eve	Steam Deck console.	X86 based handheld; Capable of hybrid operation; Used two hot swappable lithium-ion batteries.	~2005	
XGP	Steam Deck console.	Successor to the GP32; 3D capable	~2007	
Jungle (console)	Steam Deck console.	MMO oriented handheld; Clamshell design	2011	

== See also ==
- List of best-selling game consoles
- List of video game console emulators
- List of video game consoles
  - List of home video game consoles
  - List of microconsoles
  - List of dedicated consoles
  - List of retro style video game consoles
