= GPD =

GPD may refer to:

== Aviation ==
- Mount Gordon Airport, in Queensland, Australia
- Tradewind Aviation, an American airline

== Science and technology ==
- General purpose datatype, in computer science
- Generalized Pareto distribution, in statistics
- Generalized parton distributions, in particle physics
- Glyceraldehyde phosphate dehydrogenase
- GamePad Digital, a Chinese handheld game console maker (e.g.: GPD XD, GPD Win)

== US police departments ==
- Gaithersburg Police Department, Maryland
- Gatlinburg Police Department, Tennessee
- Gladstone Police Department, Oregon
- Greenbelt Police Department (Maryland)
- Guam Police Department
- Greensboro Police Department, North Carolina

== Other uses ==
- Geassocieerde Pers Diensten, a Dutch news agency
- People's Liberation Army General Political Department
