= GPD Win 2 =

Handheld Windows 10 gaming computer

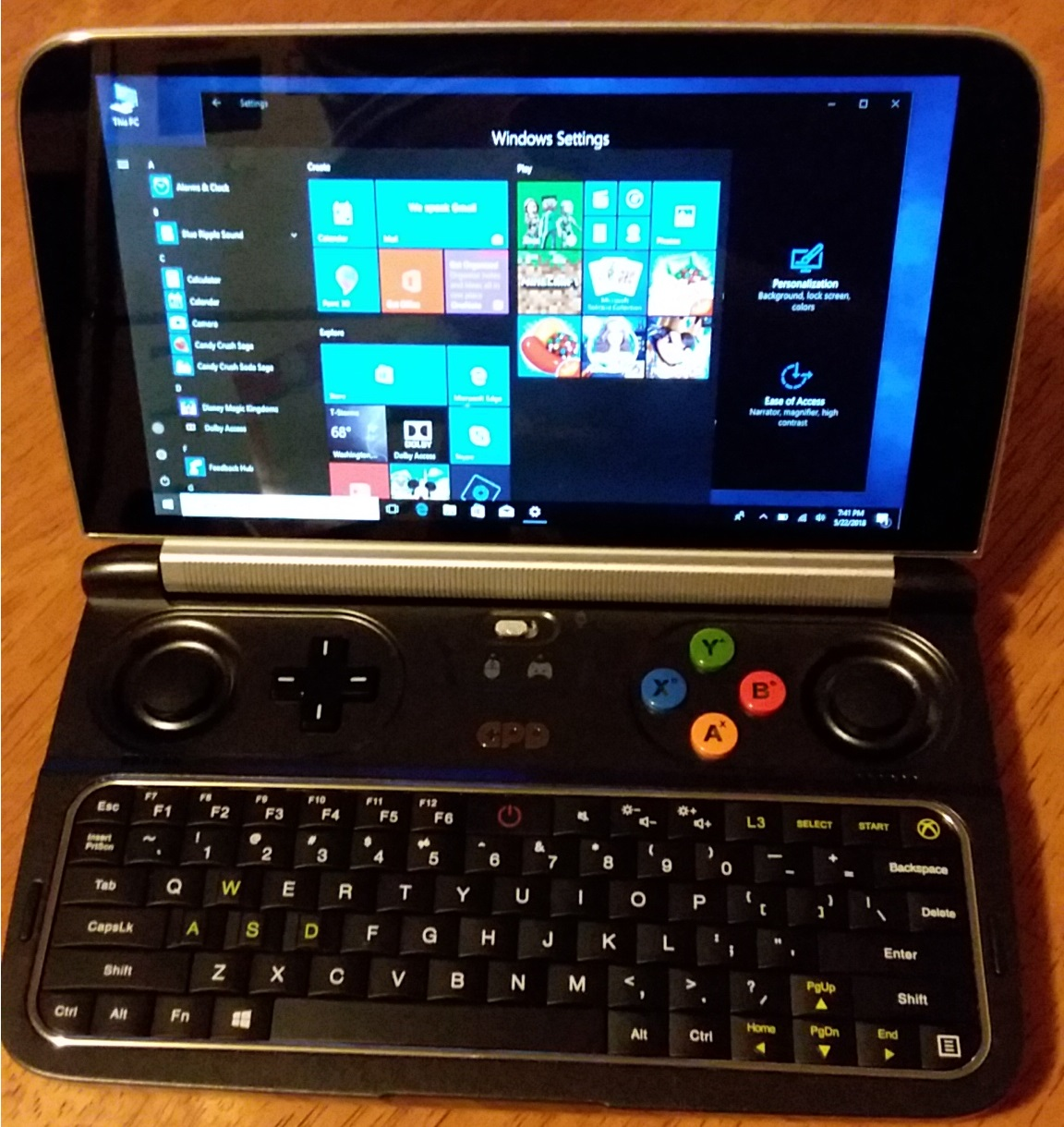
- GPD Win 2
- Manufacturer: GamePad Digital (GPD)
- Type: Handheld game console / Ultra-mobile PC / Palmtop
- Released: May 2018; 8 years ago
- Operating system: Windows 10 Home
- CPU: Intel Core M3
- Memory: 8GB RAM
- Storage: 128GB SSD (replaceable) MicroSD card slot
- Display: 6" 1280x720, 16:9 10-point touch screen
- Graphics: Intel HD 615 Graphics
- Controller input: D-pad; 4 face buttons 6 shoulder buttons 2 analog sticks
- Connectivity: Wi-Fi 802.11a/b/g/n/ac (2.4/5GHz), Bluetooth, USB 3.0 Type A, USB-C, Micro HDMI, headset port
- Dimensions: 162mm × 99mm × 25 mm (6.4 × 3.9 × 1 inch)
- Predecessor: GPD Win
- Successor: GPD Win Max, GPD Win 3, GPD Win Mini
- Related: GPD Pocket, GPD XD
- Website: Indiegogo campaign www.gpd.hk (English) www.softwincn.com (中文)

The GPD Win 2 is a Windows-based palmtop computer that is the successor to the GPD Win. It is manufactured by Chinese company GamePad Digital and was crowdfunded. Announced in first-quarter 2017, the crowdfunding campaign officially kicked off on January 15, 2018, and it was released in May 2018.

== History ==
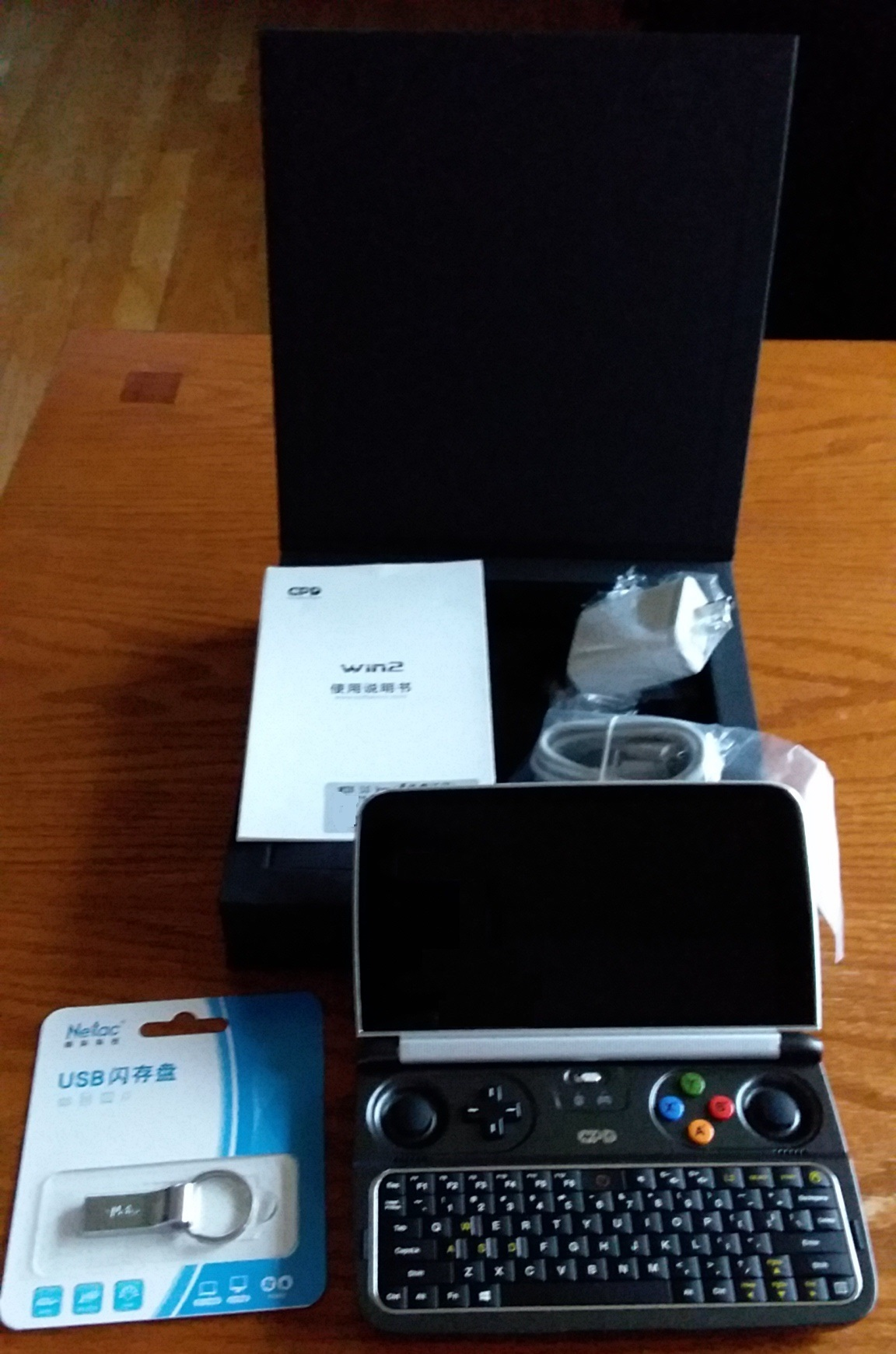
GPD Win 2-Unboxed, with all contents included with purchase: Box, instruction manual, power supply and USB-C to USB-C charging cable, USB thumb drive with Windows 10 recovery environment, and GPD Win 2 unit.

GamePad Digital released the GPD Win in October 2016. This was meant to be an answer to the lack of x86 Windows-based mobile gaming devices. The Win met with success, surpassing its target funding. Building upon this success, they announced the GPD Win 2 in 2017. By December 2017, tech media outlets such as TechRadar, The Verge, Slash Gear, ExtremeTech, and more were providing write ups and technical specs of pre-production units.

The Indiegogo campaign for the Win 2 was a success, and surpassed its stated $100,000 goal by roughly 1700% at almost $1.8 million with over 2,200 pre-order backers. By the end of the campaign, the project received $2,700,000 of backing.

== Software ==
Like its predecessor, the GPD Win 2 runs 64-bit Windows 10 Home. The system is also capable of running Linux operating systems. It has DirectX 12 and OpenGL 4.4 support. Pre-release testers have said that Linux "works perfectly", but that it's still best to use a lightweight distribution for maximum multitasking performance.

== Design ==
The GPD Win 2 frame is made of magnesium alloy, with a replaceable black ABS cover. The main shell is made of ABS to reduce weight. It has an 80-key QWERTY keyboard that extends across the body of the device. This differs from the GPD Win, which had a column of keys on the right side.

The game controller has the same dual analog sticks flanking the face of the device, moved outboard from their position on the original GPD Win. The ABXY keys have remained, but likewise moved inboard. The D-pad has been brought back as well. The mouse switch has removed D-input, only having an X-input and a mouse function (although software exists to use D-input games properly with an X-input). The shoulders have the standard L1/R1 and L2/R2 buttons, however the L3/R3 buttons have been moved to the shoulders from the keyboard as on the original GPD Win, for a total of six shoulder buttons. The top of the device has various I/O ports: USB-C, USB-A (3.0), MicroSD card slot, 3.5mm headphone jack, and a Micro HDMI port, a change from the Mini HDMI port featured on the Win. An AHCI M.2 SSD slot is present on the back of the device, underneath a removable cover. The GPD Win 2 has dual speakers on either side the face just under each analog stick. The top and back of the device have cooling fan grates. The screen has been increased from 5.5" to 6", and is an H-IPS capacitive 10-point touch screen that is reinforced with Gorilla Glass 4.

== Technical specifications ==
To facilitate the desired improved performance over the GPD Win, GamePad Digital upgraded the original model's Intel Atom CPU to an Intel Core M3-7Y30 CPU, with a base clock speed of 1.0 GHz, and a max of 2.6 GHz with Turbo Boost. This gives a single and multi-core performance with four and two times the benchmark points respectively, as the Intel Atom x7-Z8750 CPU found in the GPD Win. The 9th generation Intel HD Graphics 615 integrated card has 24 EU, up 8 more from the 405 card in the Win, and has a max dynamic frequency of 900 MHz, up from 600 MHz on the Win.

The cooling system for the GPD Win 2 was overhauled to meet the needs of the upgraded CPU, the M3's thermal design point having increased over threefold, to 15 Watts. It contains an auto controlled fan and a heat sink. The turbofan has a dynamic range of 2000 to 8800RPM, with a reported increase of eightfold over its predecessor. GamePad Digital has changed the motherboard design to accommodate the cooling system. The GPD Win used an L-type motherboard, and the Win 2 uses a dual motherboard design.

The RAM has been doubled to 8 GB of LPDDR3, the same memory type as the GPD Win. Foregoing the eMMC storage of the GPD Win, the GPD Win 2 has a 128 GB M.2 2242 solid state drive. The drive is also user-replaceable, with no capacity ceiling. It has a max theoretical transfer speed of up to 600 MB/s. GamePad Digital also has retained the MicroSD slot due to popular demand, also having no capacity ceiling.

Despite the slightly larger display, the touch screen retains the 1280x720 resolution of its predecessor; however, the device is 4K capable, and supports wireless display options. The max supported resolution using the HDMI 1.4 protocol is 4096x2304 at 24 Hz refresh rate. The device supports both Miracast and Intel WiDi wireless display technologies.

The GPD Win 2 has two 4900mAh polymer lithium batteries with 7.6V output, 37.24Wh of power, and 600Wh/L energy density. This is a claimed 49% increase of battery capacity over the GPD Win. The battery has been rated for a maximum of 6 hours of gameplay battery life. GamePad Digital claims the Win 2 to be the first device to support PD 2.0 fast charge via the USB-C cable, and that it can go from half-full battery to full charge within 45 minutes.

Category	Specification	
Launch date	2017	2019
Dimensions	162 by 99 by 25 millimetres (6.38 in × 3.90 in × 0.98 in); 460 grams (1.01 lb)	
CPU	Intel Core M3-7Y30 (1 GHz / 2.6 GHz max); TDP 15 W	Intel core M3-8100Y (1.1 GHz / 2.6 GHz max); TDP 15 W
Graphics	Intel HD 615 Graphics (300 MHz / 900 MHz max)	
Memory	8 GiB LPDDR3 1866 MHz RAM	
Storage	128 GiB M.2 2242 SATA SSD; MicroSD removable storage No capacity ceilings	256 GiB, 512 GiB or 1 TiB M.2 2242 SATA SSD; MicroSD A2 removable storage No capacity ceilings
Display	6-inch, 1280x720, H-IPS 10-point touch screen, 16:9 ratio 4K video support (4096x2304x24 max); Miracast and WiDi support	
Audio	Dual speakers 3.5mm headphone jack Internal microphone Realtek audio driver	
Audio		Better audio
Keyboard	80-button, 6-row QWERTY keyboard	
Game controls	D-pad; 4 face buttons 6 shoulder buttons 2 analog sticks	
Game controls	Vibration motor	
Slots	Single microSD slot compatible A2 standard	
Ports	USB 3.0 Type C USB 3.0 Type A Micro HDMI; 3.5mm headphone jack	
Battery	2x 4900 mAh capacity in series lithium polymer battery	
Battery	12 V @ 2 A Quick Charge	5 V @ 3 A or 12 V @ 2 A Quick Charge
Connectivity	WiFi 4 802.11 a/b/g/n/ac 2.4 GHz / 5 GHz Dual-band wifi (867 Mb/s max rate); Bluetooth 4.2	
Software	Windows 10 Home; Vulkan; DirectX 12; OpenGL 4.4; Linux (unofficial)	

== Performance ==
The GPD Win 2 has been tested to run various modern games on low settings. Grand Theft Auto V has run at 38 FPS. Overwatch runs at 50–70 FPS, and The Elder Scrolls V: Skyrim runs at an average of 53 FPS.Street Fighter IV for instance can be seen running at three times faster frame rate than on the GPD Win. Aside from improved frame rates than its predecessor, game loading times have also decreased considerably.

== Release and reception ==
GamePad Digital started shipping units to pre-order backers in May 2018. Linus Sebastian reviewed a pre-release version in January 2018. He said that he did not think that the speakers were great, but acknowledged that he was reviewing a pre-production version. He spoke positively on the keyboard, noting that it was already a significant improvement over its predecessor. Also saying that the shoulder buttons have improved in quality, with a more firm clicking feeling. He praised the ease of access of making configuration changes on the Win 2 as opposed to other portable devices. As far as performance, he noted that integrated graphics leave a lot to be desired, and that newer games will still have stutter, and mediocre frame rates. But that older games are generally fine. He did note an increase in emulation performance, testing games like Star Fox: Assault in Dolphin and Grand Theft Auto III in PCSX2. He noted that there may be some slowdown in some games, but that the input lag is negligible.

== Gallery ==
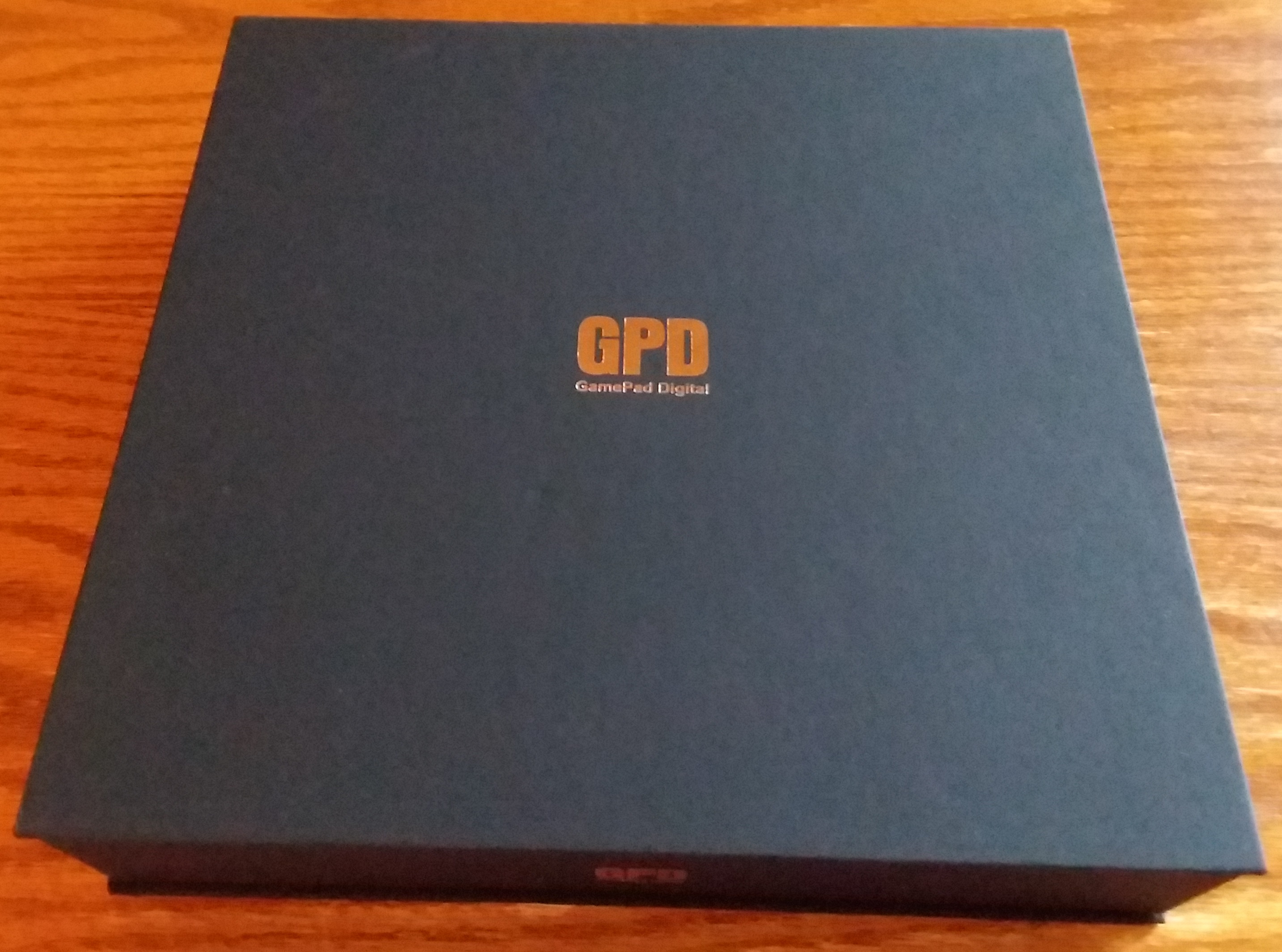
Box

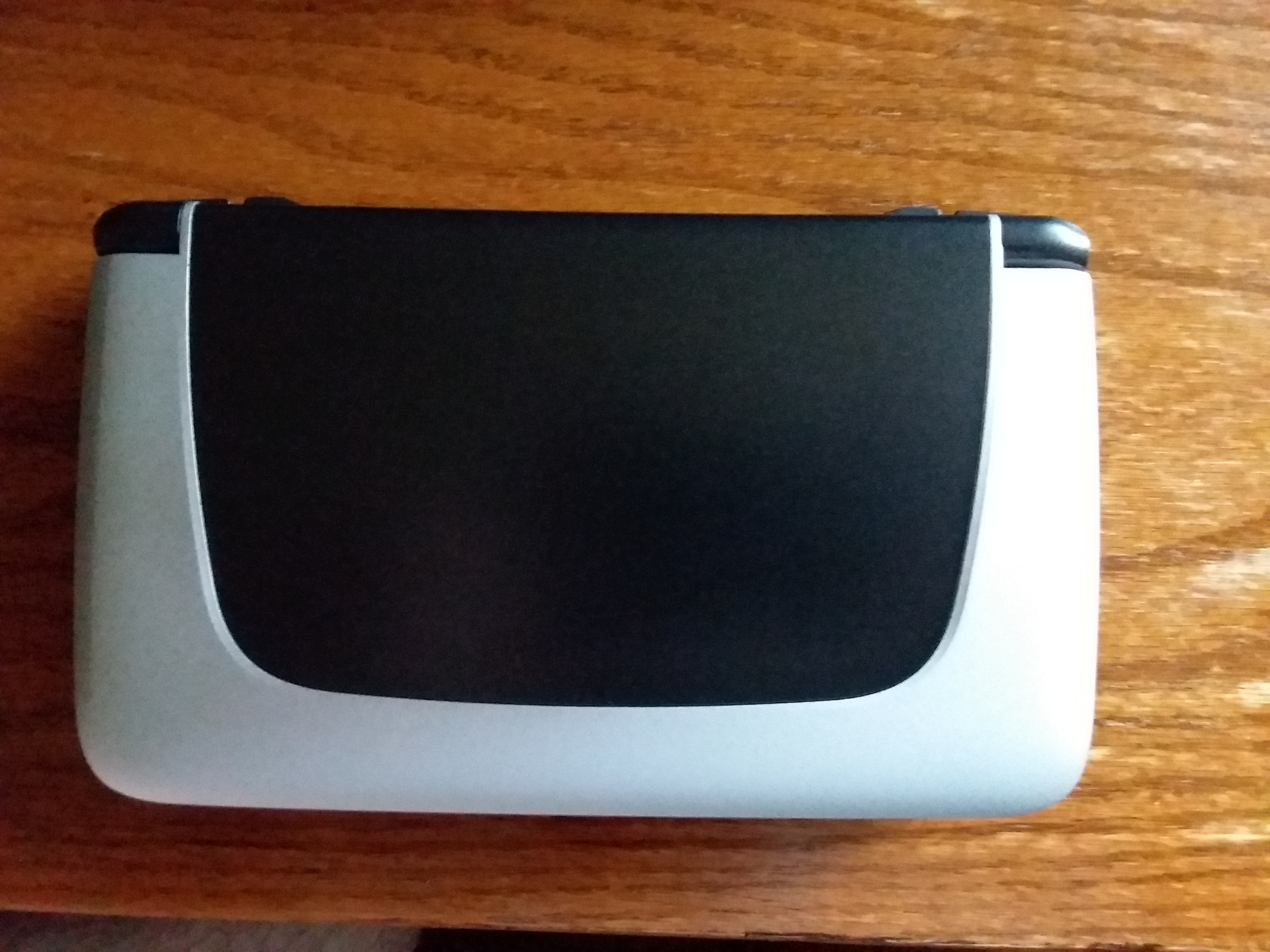
Top cover

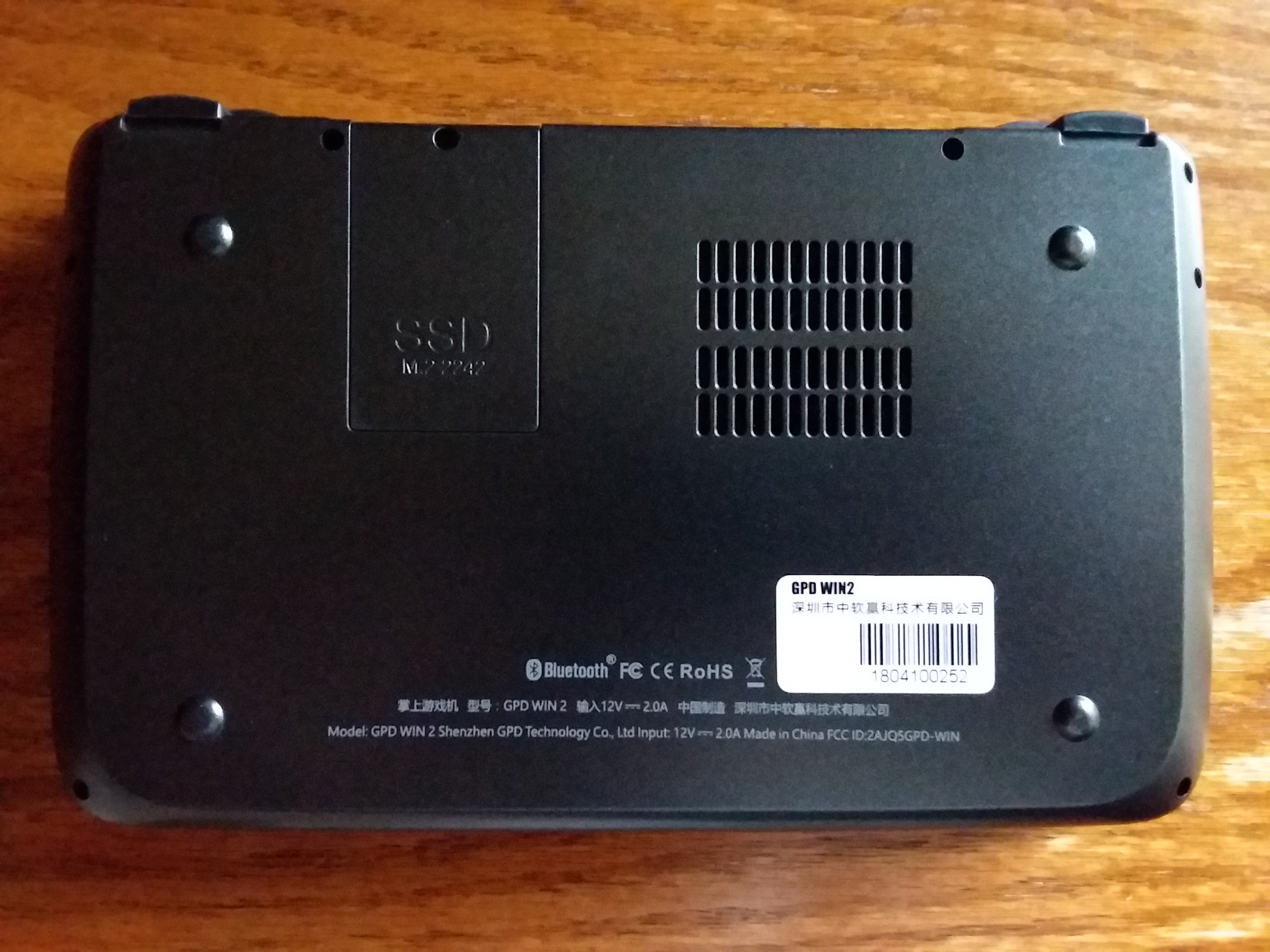
Bottom cover

Top, showing all ports and shoulder buttons

== See also ==
- Comparison of handheld game consoles
- GPD Win
- GPD Win 3
- GPD XD
- PC gaming
- Handheld game console
