= GPD Win Max =

Handheld Windows gaming computer

- Manufacturer: GamePad Digital (GPD)
- Product family: Notebook, handheld
- Type: Handheld game console / Ultra-mobile PC / Palmtop
- Released: August 2020; 6 years ago
- Operating system: Windows 10 Home
- CPU: Intel Core i5-1035G7
- Memory: 16GB DDR4 RAM
- Storage: 512GB SSD (replaceable)
- Removable storage: MicroSDXC
- Display: 8" 1280x800, 16:10 10-point touch screen
- Graphics: Intel Iris Plus Graphics 940
- Controller input: XInput; D-pad; 4 face buttons 4 shoulder buttons 2 clickable analog sticks
- Touchpad: 3-point, one button
- Connectivity: Wi-Fi 6, Bluetooth 5.0, 2× Type-A: USB 5Gbps, 1× USB-C: USB 10Gbps, 1× Thunderbolt 3, HDMI, 3.5mm Headphone/Microphone
- Power: 3x5000 mAh Lithium Ion Batteries in Series, USB Power Delivery 3.0 65W charging
- Dimensions: 207mm × 145mm × 26 mm (8.1 in × 5.7 in × 1.0 in)
- Weight: 790g (1.7 lbs)
- Predecessor: GPD Win 2
- Successor: GPD Win 3, GPD Win Max 2
- Related: GPD Pocket, GPD XD, GPD Win
- Website: Indiegogo campaign www.gpd.hk (English) www.softwincn.com (中文)

The GPD Win Max is a Windows-based palmtop computer manufactured by Gamepad Digital (GPD). It is the successor to the GPD Win 2, and was crowdfunded, like its predecessor. The GPD Win Max is rated to run AAA video game titles and emulate consoles from the sixth generation and earlier, with some support for consoles up to the eighth generation.

== History ==
Following the GPD Win 2 in 2018, and the larger GPD Pocket 2 in 2019, GPD announced their largest device yet as the GPD Win Max. This device is the size of a Netbook, and retains GPD's signature embedded controller. The Win Max was leaked and received media coverage as early as April 2019, with conclusive coverage coming in April, 2020.

Announced in the first quarter of 2020, the crowdfunding campaign was launched on Indiegogo on May 18, 2020, priced at $779. The campaign concluded on July 1, 2020 with more than 3,500 backers having contributed more than $2.8 million dollars in total. Its price also rose from $779 to $800.

== Design ==
With the Win Max being GPD's largest gaming device as of release, there was room for additions such a scissor switch keyboard which would support touch typing, similar to what is available on their GPD Pocket Range, as well as a touchpad, and an 8" screen. This unit also introduces GPD's first instance of clickable analog sticks, one of which has been moved inside the ABXY buttons, as well as buttons with a very similar style to the PlayStation Vita (with a layout and markings similar to the Xbox). The Win Max speakers have been moved underneath the unit towards the user. Access to the M.2 drive has been reduced, as the unit must be disassembled to change this drive. An ethernet port has been added to the right side of the device, which would prevent a user from effectively holding the console while this port is in use.

This increase in size has also allowed an increase in cooling potential of the Max with dual fans and Heat pipes.

Otherwise, the Win Max maintains a similar design to previous units with a milled magnesium aluminum alloy chassis and an ABS plastic shell. With the far side of the device providing access to two USB-A ports, four shoulder buttons, a USB-C port as well as a Thunderbolt 3 port, and a small reset button. The back panel also includes another change: the win series' first full-size HDMI port.

== Release and reception ==
Win Max units started shipping to Indiegogo backers on August 17, 2020. Some users have reported failure of the included USB-C power supply.

== Specification ==
Category	Specification		
Name	GPD Win Max	GPD Win Max 2021	
Launch date	June 2020	October 2021	
Dimensions	207 by 145 by 26 millimetres (8.1 in × 5.7 in × 1.0 in)		
CPU	Intel Core i5-1035G7 TDP 10-25W	Intel Core i7-1195G7	AMD Ryzen 7 4800U
Graphics	Intel Iris plus 940 Graphics	Intel Iris Xe Graphics G7 96EUs	AMD Radeon Vega Graphics 8CUs
Memory	16GB DDR4 3200 RAM	16GB	
Storage	512GB M.2 2242 solid-state drive MicroSD A2 removable storage No capacity ceilings	1 TB M.2 2242 solid-state drive	
Display	8-inch, 1280x800, H-IPS 10-point touch screen, 16:9 ratio 4K video support (4096x2304x24 max) Miracast and WiDi support		
Audio	Dual speakers 3.5mm headphone jack Internal microphone Realtek audio driver		
Keyboard	QWERTY keyboard		
Game controls	D-pad4 face buttons 6 shoulder buttons 2 analog sticks		
Slots	Single microSD slot compatible A2 standard		
Ports	1× USB Type-C: Thunderbolt 3; 1× USB Type-C: USB 10Gbps; 2× USB Type-A: USB 5Gbps; 1× HDMI 2.0b 1× 3.5mm headphone jack		2× USB Type-C: USB 10Gbps; 2× USB Type-A: USB 5Gbps; 1× HDMI 2.0b 1× 3.5mm headphone jack
Battery	3x5000mAh capacity in series lithium polymer battery 20v 3a Quick Charge		
Connectivity	Wi-Fi 6 dual-band (867 Mbit/s max rate) Bluetooth 5.0		
Software	Windows 10 Home DirectX 12 OpenGL 4.4 Linux (unofficial)		

== GPD Win Max 2 ==
=== 2022 ===
November 2022, GPD WIN Max 2 was released.

- Processor: AMD Ryzen 7 6800U with 8 cores and 16 threads, capable of reaching up to 4.7 GHz.
- Graphics: AMD Radeon 680M with RDNA2 architecture.
- Memory: Up to 32GB LPDDR5-6400 MT/s dual-channel memory.
- Storage: Up to 2TB PCIe 4.0 NVMe SSD for fast read and write speeds.
- Display: 10.1-inch 2.5K LTPS full-screen display with a resolution of 2560x1600, supporting 10-point touch and 4096-level pressure-sensitive stylus.

=== 2023 ===
- Processor: AMD Ryzen 7 7840U with 8 cores and 16 threads, capable of reaching up to 4.9 GHz.
- Graphics: AMD Radeon 780M with RDNA3 architecture.
- Memory: Up to 32GB LPDDR5-6400 MT/s dual-channel memory.
- Storage: Up to 2TB PCIe 4.0 NVMe SSD for fast read and write speeds.
- Display: 10.1-inch 2.5K LTPS full-screen display with a resolution of 2560x1600, supporting 10-point touch and 4096-level pressure-sensitive stylus.

=== 2024 ===
The GPD Win Max 2 2024 version was released in December 2023

- Processor: AMD Ryzen 7 8840U with 8 cores and 16 threads, capable of reaching up to 4.9 GHz.
- Graphics: AMD Radeon 780M with RDNA3 architecture.
- Memory: Up to 64GB LPDDR5X-6400 MT/s dual-channel memory.
- Storage: Up to 4TB PCIe 4.0 NVMe SSD for fast read and write speeds.
- Display: 10.1-inch 2.5K LTPS full-screen display with a resolution of 2560x1600, supporting 10-point touch and 4096-level pressure-sensitive stylus.
- Design: Lightweight and durable all-aluminum unibody design.
- Battery: Large 67Wh battery, providing long battery life and supporting 100W PD fast charging.
- Connectivity: Multiple ports including 1× USB-C: USB 40Gbps, 1× USB-C: USB 10Gbps, 2× Type-A: USB 10Gbps, HDMI 2.1, and SD card slots, along with Wi-Fi 6E and Bluetooth 5.3 support.

=== 2025 ===
The GPD Win Max 2 2025 version was released in December 2024

- Processor: AMD Ryzen AI 9 HX 370 with 12 cores and 24 threads, capable of reaching up to 5.1 GHz.
- Graphics: AMD Radeon 890M with RDNA3.5 architecture.
- Memory: Up to 64GB LPDDR5X-7500 MT/s dual-channel memory.
- Storage: Up to 4TB PCIe 4.0 NVMe SSD for fast read and write speeds.
- Display: 10.1-inch 2.5K LTPS full-screen display with a resolution of 2560x1600, supporting 10-point touch and 4096-level pressure-sensitive stylus.
- Design: Lightweight and durable all-aluminum unibody design.
- Battery: Large 67Wh battery, providing long battery life and supporting 100W PD fast charging.
- Connectivity: Multiple ports including 2× USB-C: USB 40Gbps, 2× Type-A: USB 10Gbps, HDMI 2.1, and SD card slots, along with Wi-Fi 6E and Bluetooth 5.3 support

== See also ==
- Comparison of handheld game consoles
- GPD Win
- GPD Win 2
- GPD Win 3
- GPD XD
- PC gaming
- Handheld game console
