= Handheld PC Explorer =

Handheld PC Explorer, or as it is more commonly referred to, H/PC Explorer was the Windows PC host client for the inaugural generation of Microsoft Windows CE 1.0 based embedded PC companion devices, the Handheld PC.

== Release history ==
There were two releases of H/PC Explorer.

=== Handheld PC Explorer 1.0 ===
The initial release of H/PC Explorer was only made available on CD as part of the software set of the early Windows CE 1.0 Handheld PC releases. Version 1.0, like Windows CE 1.0 itself was generally considered to be a beta release, and was received poorly by the user community because of inherent instability within the synchronisation program. Version 1.0 only supported Windows 95, severely restricting the scope of Windows CE's adoption in enterprise environments running Windows NT 4.0. No sync client was ever released for Windows CE which ran natively under Windows NT 3.51 or lower.

=== Handheld PC Explorer 1.1 ===
The second release of the software fixed many of the stability and compatibility flaws experienced by users of 1.0. Windows NT 4.0 support was finally added to the product, along with support for the initial release of Microsoft Outlook in the form of Outlook 97.

Handheld PC Explorer 1.1 was also released as a freely available web download, along with being bundled onto Handheld PC Companion software CDs in mid to late 1997.

== See also ==
- ActiveSync
- Handheld PC
- Windows CE
