= Digi Casse =

Handheld game console

- Also known as: Digital Cassette
- Developer: Bandai
- Type: Handheld game console
- Generation: Second
- Released: JP: 1984; EU: 1986
- Media: ROM cartridge
- Power: 1 to 2 LR44 button cell batteries depending on the model
- Successor: Design Master Senshi Mangajukuu

The Digi Casse (Japanese: デジカセ, Hepburn: Dejikase) is a handheld game console developed by Bandai and released in Japan on 1984 and later in Europe in 1986 during the second generation of video game consoles. Only 8 games are known to exist for the system.

== Games ==
Each console came with 2 pack in games. In Japan there were two retail configurations, A and B. Europe had several retail configurations and four games released.

=== A ===
- Express home delivery (Japanese: 宅急便, Hepburn: Takkyūbin)
- City Turbo Race (Japanese: シティターボレース, Hepburn: Shititāborēsu)

=== B ===
- Hageransu (Japanese: ハゲランス, Hepburn: Hageransu)
- Mt. Fuji explosion (Japanese: 富士山大爆発, Hepburn: Fujiyama daibakuhatsu)

=== European release ===
- Pelican
- Penguin
- Submarine
- Frog & Insects

== Hardware ==
Each game cartridge included an LCD.

The system used one to two LR44 button cell batteries depending on the model.
