= Pandora (computer) =

Handheld gaming computer

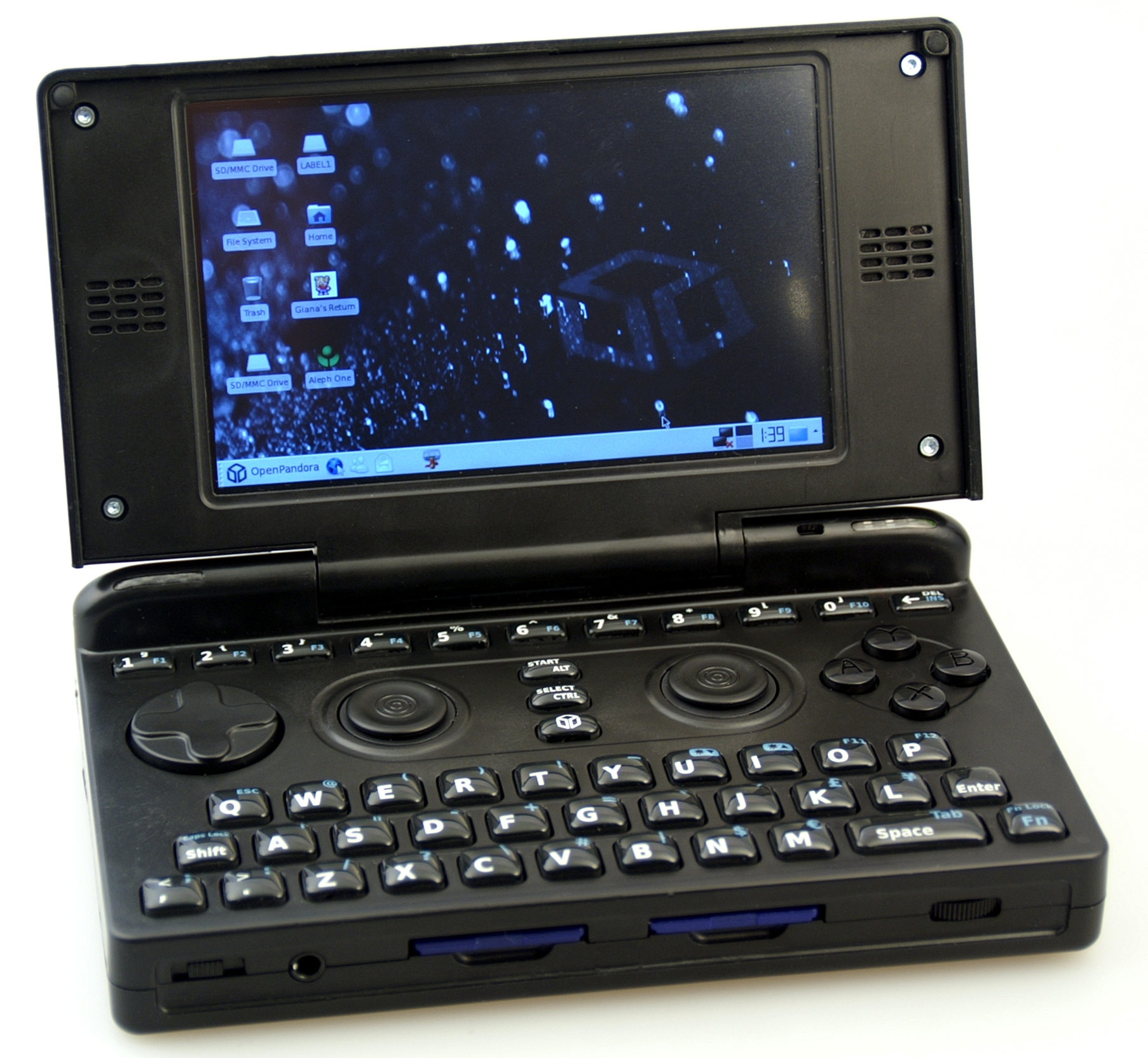
- Manufacturer: OpenPandora GmbH
- Type: Handheld gaming computer
- Released: May 2010; 16 years ago
- Operating system: Ångström Linux custom edition
- CPU: OMAP 3530 (600+ MHz Cortex-A8 (32-bit) and 430 MHz TMS320C64x+, Neon & TRADE SIMD instruction set
- Memory: 256 MB low power DDR-333
- Storage: Dual SDHC slots, 512 MB internal NAND, USB external storage
- Graphics: PowerVR SGX 530 at 110 MHz
- Connectivity: Wi-Fi, USB 2.0, Bluetooth
- Predecessor: GP2X (unofficial)
- Successor: DragonBox Pyra
- Website: boards.openpandora.org

The Pandora was a handheld gaming computer developed and produced by OpenPandora, which is made up of former distributors and community members of the GP32 and GP2X handhelds. Originally released in 2010, it was designed to take advantage of existing free and open-source software and to be a target for homebrew development. The Pandora runs Linux and uses an ARM processor. Until 2013, multiple batches of slightly updated Pandora variants were produced. In 2014, development of a redesigned and upgraded successor, named DragonBox Pyra, began.

== History ==
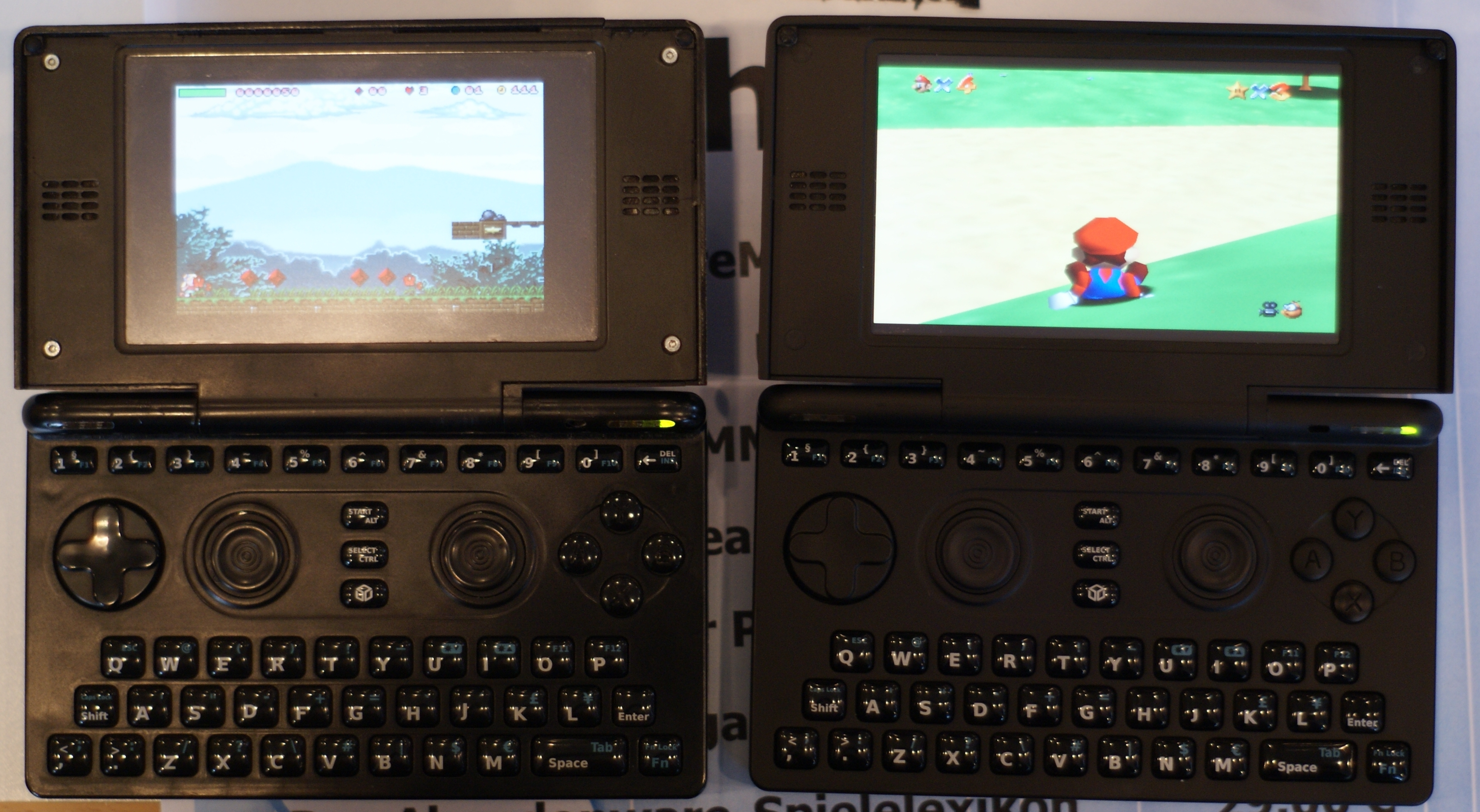
A prototype model (left), compared to a production model (right)

Development of the Pandora began when Craig Rothwell, Fatih Kilic, Michael Mrozek and (later) Michael Weston teamed up and planned a portable system that would excel in the areas where they thought the GP32 and GP2X systems (from Game Park and GamePark Holdings respectively) were flawed. The Pandora was designed based on ideas and suggestions contributed by GP32X forum members, with the goal of creating the ultimate open source handheld device. When announcing the system, the designers of Pandora stated that it would be more powerful than any handheld video game console that had yet existed.

The final case and keymat design was made by Dave Cancilier (DaveC), who was known on the forums for custom hardware modifications.

In February 2008 the Pandora wiki had already been created; as of 2014, it contains a thousand pages and is translated with the MediaWiki Translate extension.

The initial development and setup costs were funded through a crowdfunding approach where early supporters provided enough money to support a production run, and when the console made it into production, each supporter would receive the device they paid for (what actually ended up happening due to cost overruns is that the early supporters received devices as later sales recouped the initial investment costs). OpenPandora began taking payments on September 30, 2008 and began shipping to customers on May 21, 2010. In late 2011, after production problems, OpenPandora shifted its production from Texas to Germany, delaying production, and the device was upgraded from 256 MB to 512 MB RAM.

As of September 3, 2012, 4600 units had been shipped and 400 early supporters were still waiting to receive a console, as these pre-orders are only fulfilled when sales to new customers are made. Since June 2012, a new 1 GHz model has been made available in limited amounts during the summer 2012. Due to the shortage of previous 600 MHz chips, this new model has become the de facto standard in 2013.

In March 2013, the pre-order queue of the German OpenPandora GmbH company (owned by Michael Mrozek aka EvilDragon) was finally cleared. The remaining pre-order queue of the UK OpenPandora Ltd. company (owned by Craig Rothwell) turned out to be significantly larger than originally reported, and the UK company has requested to be struck off. This means that the original pre-orderers at the UK company are unlikely to ever get their unit from the UK company. Also because of this, buyers have lost their money. Although there is no legal connection between the two companies, the German OpenPandora GmbH company is trying to help those UK customers by offering them significant discounts (if they decide to buy a unit from the German company instead of waiting for the UK company) and by organizing community donations to get them peer-funded units.

As of December 2, 2013, about 6000 units have been shipped. On November 19, 2013, it was announced that production of the final Pandora batch had begun. About 7500 Pandoras were made and sold altogether between 2010 and 2014, with further production made impossible due to shortage of Wi-Fi chips.

In 2014, the OpenPandora project opened the hardware design files to the community, making the OpenPandora a type of open source hardware.

Speculation and discussion about a successor to the Pandora began on the OpenPandora boards. Features and a demo prototype were announced at FOSDEM 2014. The project is named DragonBox Pyra.

== Overview ==
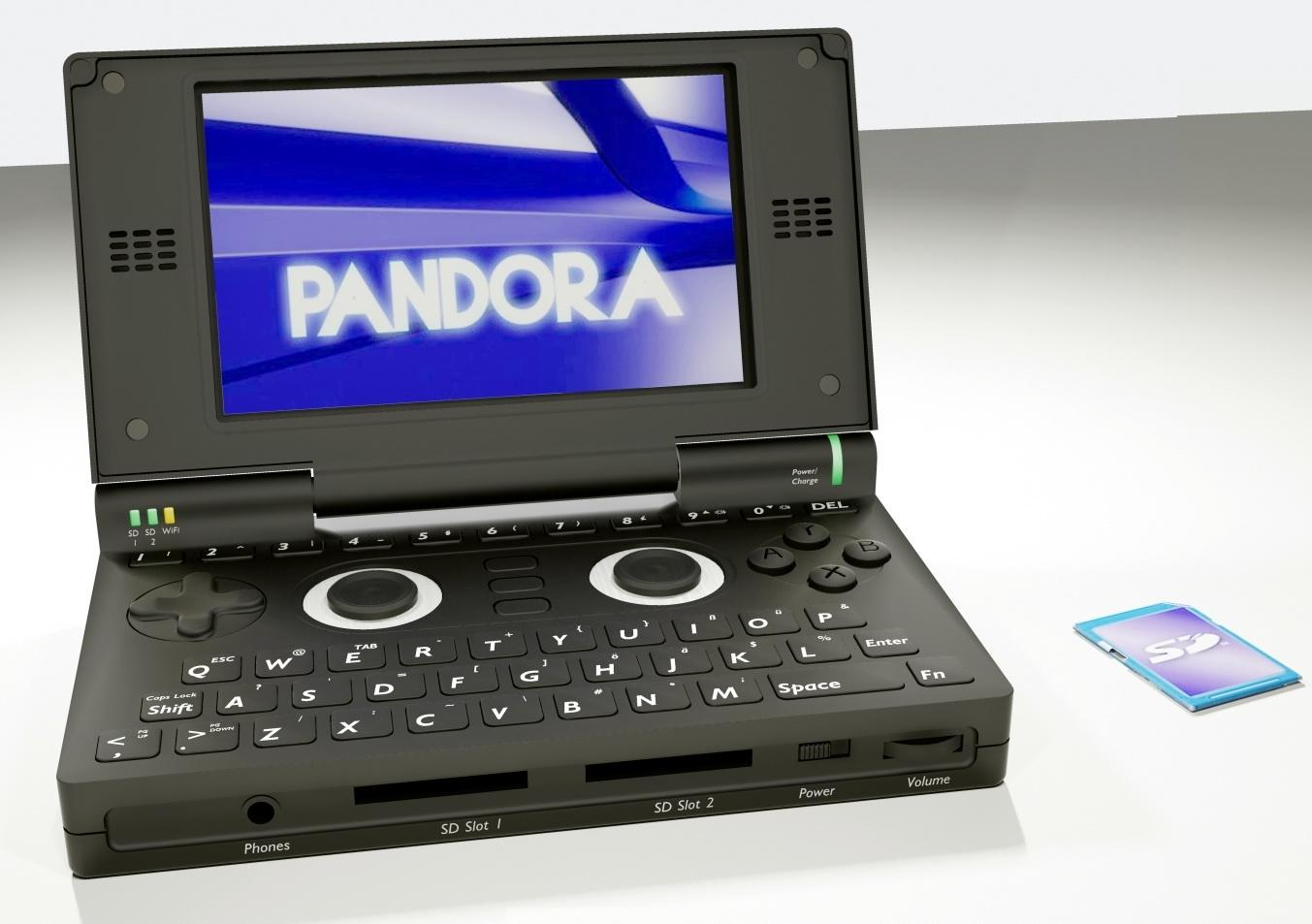
The render of the Pandora, by OpenPandora in late 2008

The Pandora is designed to be a handheld game console with high-end personal digital assistant (PDA) abilities, but may also be run as a low-power full-featured Linux desktop. The system by default comes with a Linux-based OS based on Ångström.

The interface is custom themed to fit the small form factor and touchscreen, analogue joystick, and keyboard-based inputs available. Users can install and run their own desktop environment if they choose. Users may even install other Linux distributions like Ubuntu or Gentoo themselves. It is also possible to run Android (gingerbread) through a PND package on the Ångström distribution, but it needs overclocking to perform flawlessly.

One of Pandora's major intended uses is for homebrew gaming and for the emulation of older computer systems and video game consoles, which is possible through efficient use of the resources made available by the Texas Instruments OMAP 3530 system on a chip (SoC). The Pandora developers have already shown working emulators for Dreamcast (Dreamcast emulator was never released), PlayStation, Nintendo 64, Amiga, SNES, Atari Jaguar and Sega Mega Drive software, and the Pandora is thought by its developers to have the potential to emulate most if not all machines older than the Dreamcast.

For software and video games where source code is available (see List of commercial video games with available source code), instead of emulation, source ports were created for the Pandora; notable examples are Jagged Alliance 2 and Homeworld.

The device is also intended for use as a portable media playback device with a storage capacity of up to 128 GB of data (64 GB SDXC cards) across two SD memory card slots.

The Pandora uses standard libraries such as OpenGL ES and SDL which are freely available, allowing anyone who wishes the ability to develop for the system. Many developers from the GP2x community have publicly stated that they will be developing applications for the new system.

The Pandora is compatible with Debian packages built for the ARM architecture using APT. A Git repository offers the latest kernel source.

Lists on the community-maintained Pandora Wiki keep track of new software releases. Most, but not all, Pandora software is uploaded to either the Pandora Apps, the Pandora File Archive or Pandora Repo websites. The Pandora File Archive existed first and is run by Michael Mrozek. Pandora Apps was launched by Craig Rothwell in May 2010, and is designed for viewing on the Pandora's smaller screen resolution.

The Pandora Repo (yet unnamed) was developed by a member of the community with help from the community. Its use has been adopted quickly as it tends to have the latest software releases first, as it doesn't require developers to enter any details about the application being uploaded—instead, these are automatically acquired from the application itself.

The Pandora Repo is also the first that uses the community created REPO specifications which allows native clients to get applications from the pandora repo without actually visiting the website (much akin to Synaptic package manager).

The Pandora community is also notable for the development of tools required to achieve several successful static recompilations of complex binary software to the Pandora platform. For instance, in 2014 an ARM architecture version of the 1998 video game StarCraft was generated by static recompilation from the original x86 version. In 2015, a similar port of Diablo II followed.

== Technical specifications ==
There are several Pandora variants.

=== Pandora Classic ===
Specifications:

- Texas Instruments OMAP 3530 SoC
  - ARM Cortex-A8 CPU @ 600 MHz
  - PowerVR SGX530 @ 110 MHz
  - IVA2+ audio and video processor with TMS320C64x+ DSP Core @ 430 MHz using DaVinci technology
- 256 MiB DDR-333 SDRAM
- 512 MB NAND flash memory
- Integrated Wi-Fi 802.11b/g
- Integrated Bluetooth 2.0 + EDR (3 Mbit/s) (Class 2, +4dBm)
- 800×480 resolution touchscreen LCD, 4.3" widescreen, 16.7 million colors (300 cd/m2 brightness, 450:1 contrast ratio)
- Dual SDHC card slots (currently supporting up to 32 GB of storage each, supports SDIO)
- Gamepad controls with 2 shoulder buttons
- Dual analog nubs; 15 mm diameter, concave, 2.5 mm travel from centre
- 43 button QWERTY and numeric keypad
- USB 2.0 high-speed port (480 Mbit/s) capable of providing standard 500 mA current to attached devices, USB On-The-Go supporting charging Pandora
- Externally accessible UART for hardware hacking and debugging
- Internal microphone plus ability to connect external microphone through headset
- Headphone output up to 150 mW/channel into 16 ohms, 99 dB SNR
- TV output (composite and S-Video, both for PAL and NTSC)
- Brick prevention with integrated bootloader for safe code experimentation
- Runs the Linux kernel (2.6.x for older versions, 3.2 in the latest Super Zaxxon firmware from July 2012)
- 4200 mAh rechargeable lithium polymer battery
- Estimated 8.5–10+ hour battery life for games, 10+ hour battery life for video and general applications, 100+ hours for music playback (with maximum power management), and 450+ hours in suspend-to-ram
- Dimensions: 140.29 mm × 83.48 mm × 29.25 mm (5.523 in × 3.287 in × 1.152 in) (314 ml) (5.51×3.27×1.06 in)
- Mass: 320 g (0.71 lb)

=== Pandora Rebirth ===
Based on Pandora Classic with these changes:

- OMAP 3530 SoC
  - PowerVR SGX530 @110 MHz (newer revision)
- 512 MiB DDR-333 SDRAM

=== Pandora 1 GHz ===
Based on Pandora Classic/Rebirth with these changes:

- Texas Instruments DM3730 SoC
  - ARM Cortex-A8 CPU @ 1 GHz
  - PowerVR SGX530 @ 200 MHz
  - IVA2.2 audio and video processor with TMS320C64x+ DSP Core @ 800 MHz
- 512 MiB DDR-333 SDRAM @ 200 MHz

== DragonBox Pyra ==
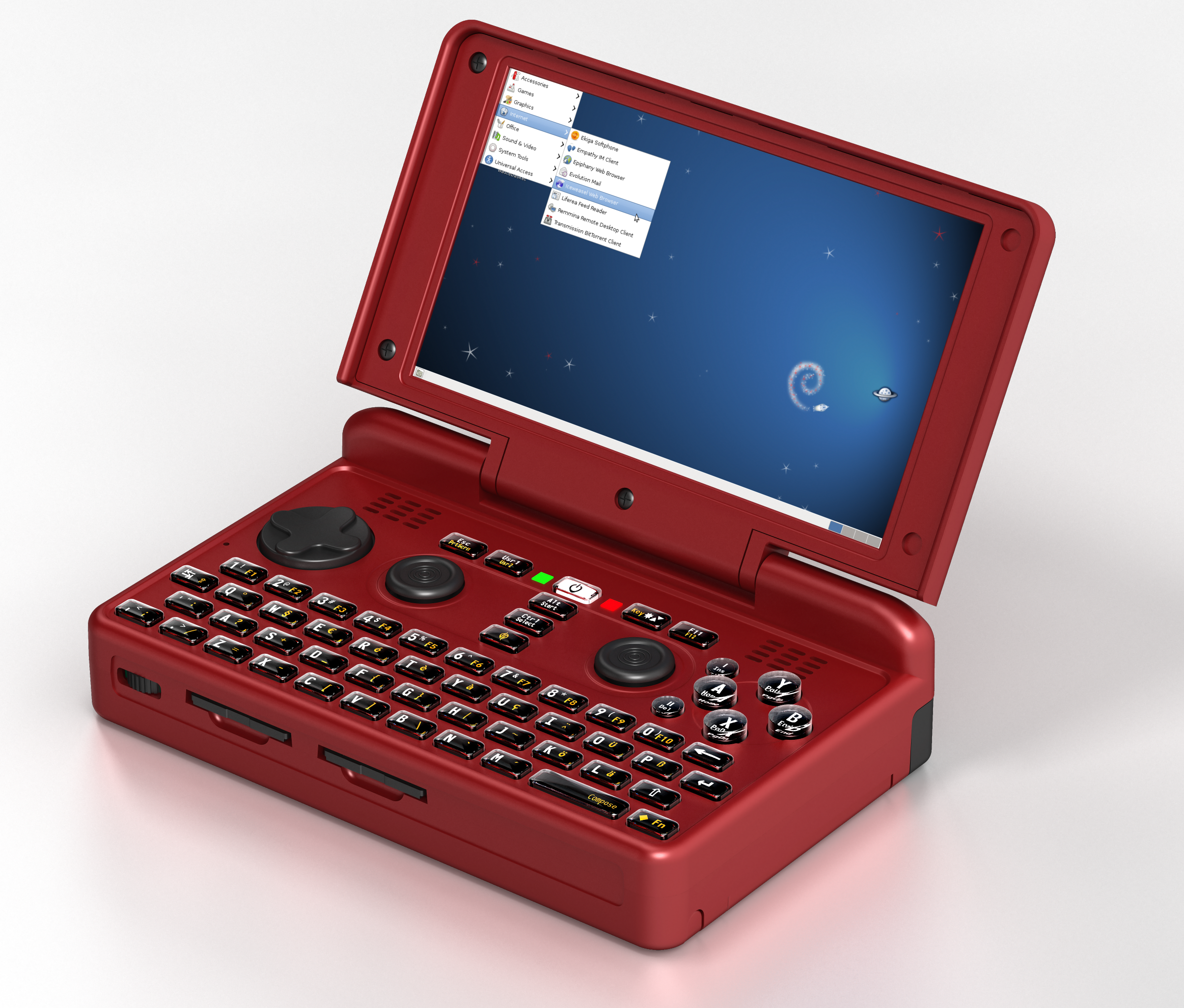
Rendering of a red Pyra

The Dragonbox Pyra is the spiritual successor of the OpenPandora device, and shares some of the original Pandora team members. The Pyra is designed and developed in close connection with the OpenPandora community, including their feedback and experience with Pandora. The OpenPandora GmbH, residing in Germany, organizes design, prototyping, and production in Europe (Greece and Germany).

The project entered prototyping stage in 2015. Pre-orders began on 1 May 2016, with a final release date still undefined. In August 2020, the first production model had been shipped, but only to developers, as the software wasn't ready.

== Similar products ==
Other single-board computers using OMAP 3530 series processors include OSWALD developed by Oregon State University students for computer science education, BeagleBoard, IGEPv2, Touch Book, and Gumstix Overo series. The cancelled Gizmondo 2 was to be a potential commercial competitor of Pandora.

GPD Win can also run Linux.

== See also ==
- Linux gaming
