= Design Master Denshi Mangajuku =

1995 video game console

- Developer: Bandai
- Type: Handheld game console
- Generation: Fifth generation
- Released: JP: March 3, 1995
- Media: ROM cartridge
- CPU: Hitachi H8/3334 @ 7.63 Mhz
- Display: 160 x 150 pixel monochrome LCD screen
- Predecessor: Digi Casse
- Successor: WonderSwan

The Design Master Denshi Mangajuku (Japanese: 電子 漫画 塾, Hepburn: Denshi manga juku) is a touchscreen handheld game console developed by Bandai and released in Japan in 1995 during the fifth generation of video game consoles.

== Overview ==
On March 3, 1995 Bandai released a new portable gaming console geared towards children. It was called the Bandai Design Master Denshi Mangajuku (電子 漫画 塾), the first touch screen handheld console ever created.

Nine cartridges were made for the system, although only eight were released to retail. Only four of the cartridges are games, with the rest being design cartridges which contain sprites of licensed characters the player can use in games by connecting the design cartridge onto an additional port on the game cartridge. The games themselves are basic and are either RPG battle games, or simple drawing programs.

In August 2020, the video game preservation group "Gaming Alexandria" made dumps and scans of the system and all of its nine available cartridges.

== Technical specifications ==
The console used a Hitachi H8/3334 CPU running at 7.63 Mhz, and featured a 160 x 150 pixel monochrome LCD screen.

== Cartridges ==
=== Games ===
- Bishoujo Senshi Sailor Moon SS Illustration Club
- Dragon Ball Z Taisen-gata Search Battle
- Dungeon Diver
- Rockman X3 Buster Battle

=== Designs ===
- Dragon Ball Z
- From TV Animation Slam Dunk
- Super Street Fighter II X
- Rockman X3 Buster Battle

=== Unreleased ===
- Weekly Shonen Jump Special
