= GPD Win =

2016 Chinese handheld computer running Windows

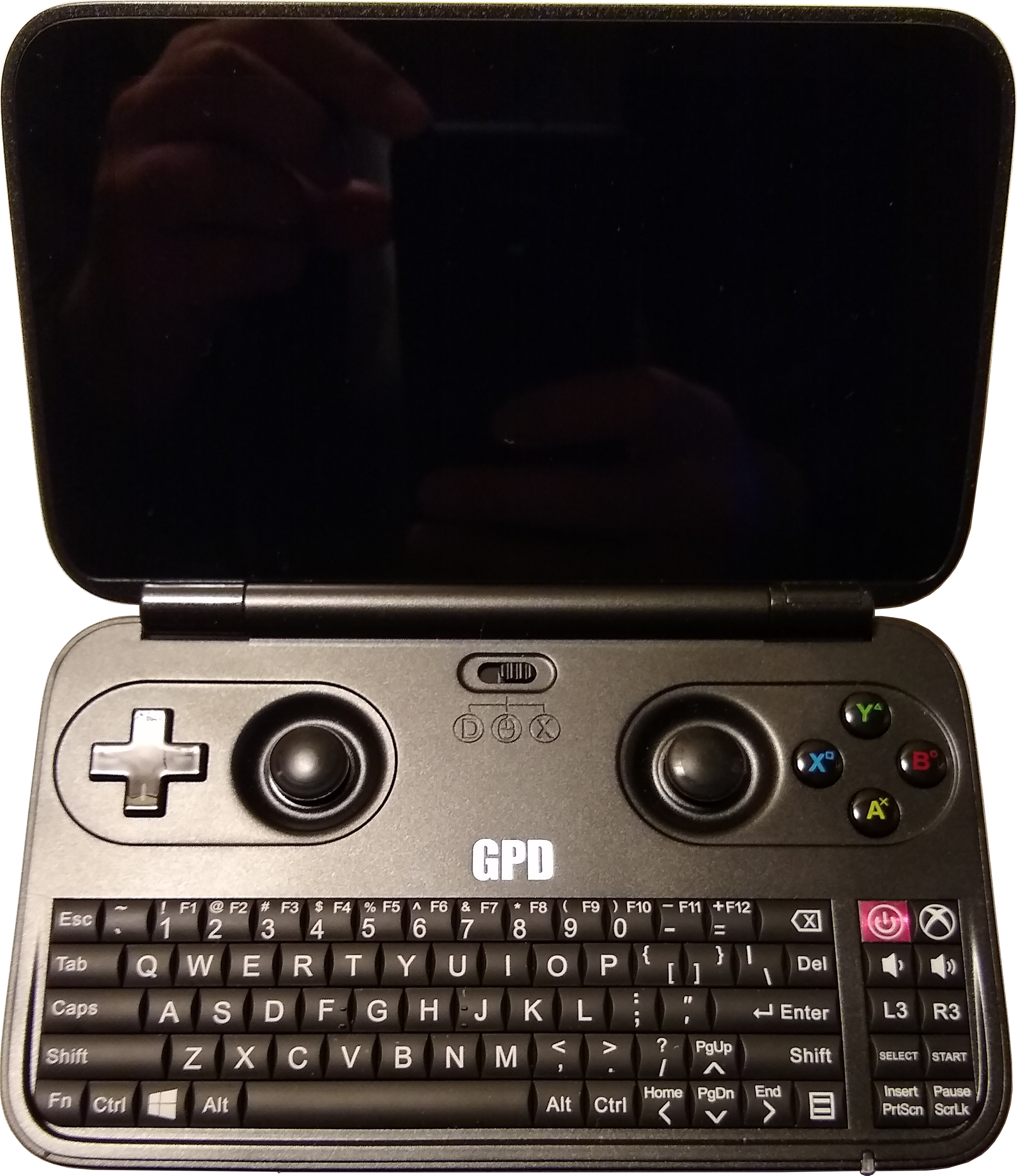
- GPD Win - face view
- Manufacturer: GamePad Digital (GPD)
- Type: Handheld game console / Ultra-mobile PC / Palmtop
- Released: October 2016; 10 years ago
- Operating system: Windows 10 Home
- CPU: First model: Intel Atom x7-Z8700 Second model:Intel Atom x7-Z8750
- Memory: 4 GB LPDDR3 RAM
- Storage: 64 GB eMMC 4.51, one microSD slot
- Display: 5.5" 1280×720 px, 720p 16:9-ratio Capacitive display, multi-touch support with Gorilla Glass 3
- Graphics: Intel HD 405 Graphics
- Controller input: D-pad, four front-facing action buttons, four side buttons, two analog sticks
- Connectivity: Wi-Fi 802.11a/b/g/n/ac (2.4 & 5GHz), Bluetooth, USB 3.0 Type A, USB-C, MiniHDMI, headset port.
- Power: 6,900 mAh battery
- Dimensions: 155 × 97 × 22 mm (6.1 × 3.8 × 0.9 inch)
- Successor: GPD Win 2, GPD Win 3, GPD Win 4
- Website: www.gpd.hk (English) www.softwincn.com (Chinese)

GPD Win is a Windows-based palmtop computer equipped with a keyboard and video game controls, designed by GamePad Digital (GPD) of China. It is an x86-based computer that runs Windows 10 and so is able to run x86 applications within the confines of the computer's hardware. First announced in October 2015, it was crowdfunded via Indiegogo and two other crowdfunding sites in Japan and China. The GPD Win was released in October 2016.

== History ==
GamePad Digital (GPD) is a technology company based in Shenzhen, China. Among other products, they have created several handheld video game consoles which run Android on ARM architecture; for instance, GPD XD. GPD Win was meant to be a way to play PC games, PC-based video game console emulators, and hypervisors (such as VMware and VirtualBox clients) on a handheld.

GamePad Digital first explored the idea of GPD Win in October 2015. In December 2015, the physical design and hardware specifications were determined. In March 2016, initial prototypes were finished, debugged, and shipped. GPD started accepting pre-orders in June 2016 through several online retailers, including the Indiegogo page. Pre-order backers were offered units for a discounted price of $330, with an estimated final retail price of $499, but the price settled at $330 after release. The initially stated goal was $100,000. In August 2016, a small batch shipment to industry personnel was shipped. GPD started shipping the final product by October 2016.

== Software ==
The GPD Win ships with Windows 10 Home and is able to run most x86 Windows applications that can be run on desktops and laptops.

As of April 2017, several patches are available for the Linux kernel that allows mostly complete functionality of the Win with a full desktop Linux distribution like Ubuntu.

== Technical and physical specifications ==
The computer has a full typical QWERTY keyboard, which includes 67 standard keys and 10 expanded function keys. For gaming, the controller has a stylized similarly to the OpenPandora and DragonBox Pyra style keyboard and controller layout of one D-pad, two analog sticks, four face buttons, and four shoulder buttons (two on each shoulder).

It was initially intended to use the Intel Atom x5-Z8500 Cherry Trail CPU.

The graphics processor is an Intel HD Graphics integrated GPU with a base clock speed of 200 MHz and a turbo boost of up to 600 MHz.

It uses 4GB of LPDDR3-1600 RAM, with 64GB of eMMC 4.51 ROM. It has a single microSD slot that can support storage cards up to 256GB.

The chassis is 15.5×9.7 cm in size. It has a 5.5-inch 1280×720 (720p) H-IPS multi-directional touch screen in a 16:9 ratio, reinforced by Gorilla Glass 3.

The audio system consists of a built-in speaker using the Realtek ALC5645 driver, and a microphone jack. It supports typical audio/video/image formats, such as MP3, MP4, JPG, PNG, and GIF.

The system has a 6700mAh polymer lithium-ion battery with a USB-C charging interface (5 V/2.5 A). It has support for Bluetooth 4.0 and 802.11 b/g/n/ac (5 GHz and 2.4 GHz) WiFi.

== Release and reception ==
GamePad Digital began shipping the GPD Win to backers in October 2016. JC Torres of Slashgear gave the Win a 7/10, stating that it is "Well-rounded and has solid technical specs per expected needs, it is ambitious for being a Windows 10-based handheld console in an industry dominated by Linux-based handhelds," but he also noted an inconsistent build quality among models, and mediocre sound quality ("loud, but low"). Ultimately, he called it an "exceptional device".

Linus Sebastian made a video review of the GPD Win on his YouTube channel Linus Tech Tips and stated that it handles gaming and multitasking capabilities and was happy with the hardware specifications, hardware design, and features overall. He stated that deciding whether it was worth the price was up to the user and that Win made him excited about the prospect of what UMPCs will be capable of in the near future as the hardware progresses further.

== Successors ==
GamePad Digital announced the GPD Win 2 in early 2017. It has a few external hardware changes, including moving the analog knobs outwards from the frame and an additional shoulder button on each side, for a total of six.

== See also ==
- Comparison of handheld game consoles
- Steam Deck
- GPD XD
- GPD Win Max
- GPD Win 3
- Pandora (computer)
- PC gaming
- Handheld game console
