= GamePad Digital =

Chinese technology company

- Founded: 2013
- Headquarters: Nanshan, Shenzhen, China
- Website: www.gpd.hk

GamePad Digital (GPD), officially known as Shenzhen GPD Technology Co., Ltd., is a Chinese technology company that develops mainly miniature electronics that has been described as palmtops, ultra-mobile PCs, and handheld gaming computers , often via crowdfunding.

== History and products ==
Their first major product was the GPD XD, a handheld game console running Android, designed for running older video games. It was released in late 2015. An upgraded version called GPD XD Plus was released in 2018.

GamePad Digital introduced the GPD Win in late 2016, a palmtop computer with gaming controls like a handheld game console, running Windows 10. Numerous successors have been developed by the company like GPD Win 2 and GPD Win Max. In 2024, CNET named the GPD Win 4 as one of the "best handheld gaming PCs".

In 2017, the company launched GPD Pocket running on Windows 10 or Ubuntu, a palmtop computer and one which Forbes called the "world's smallest laptop" due to its pocketable size. It was followed up by a second generation GPD Pocket 2, in 2018. A third generation was released by 2021. The GPD Pocket 3 increases the display size to 8-inches.

In December 2018, the company introduced the GPD MicroPC. In June 2019, crowdfunding launched for GPD P2 Max, the "world's smallest Ultrabook". A second generation was released in 2022.

In 2024, the company also introduced its first standard sized notebook computer, GPD Duo, with two displays.
