= Handheld PC =

Class of personal computers that is significantly smaller than a laptop

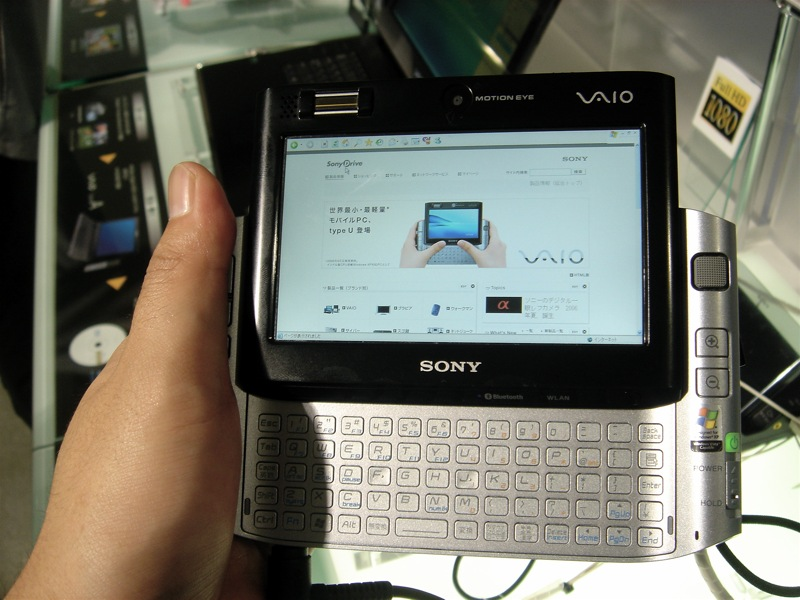
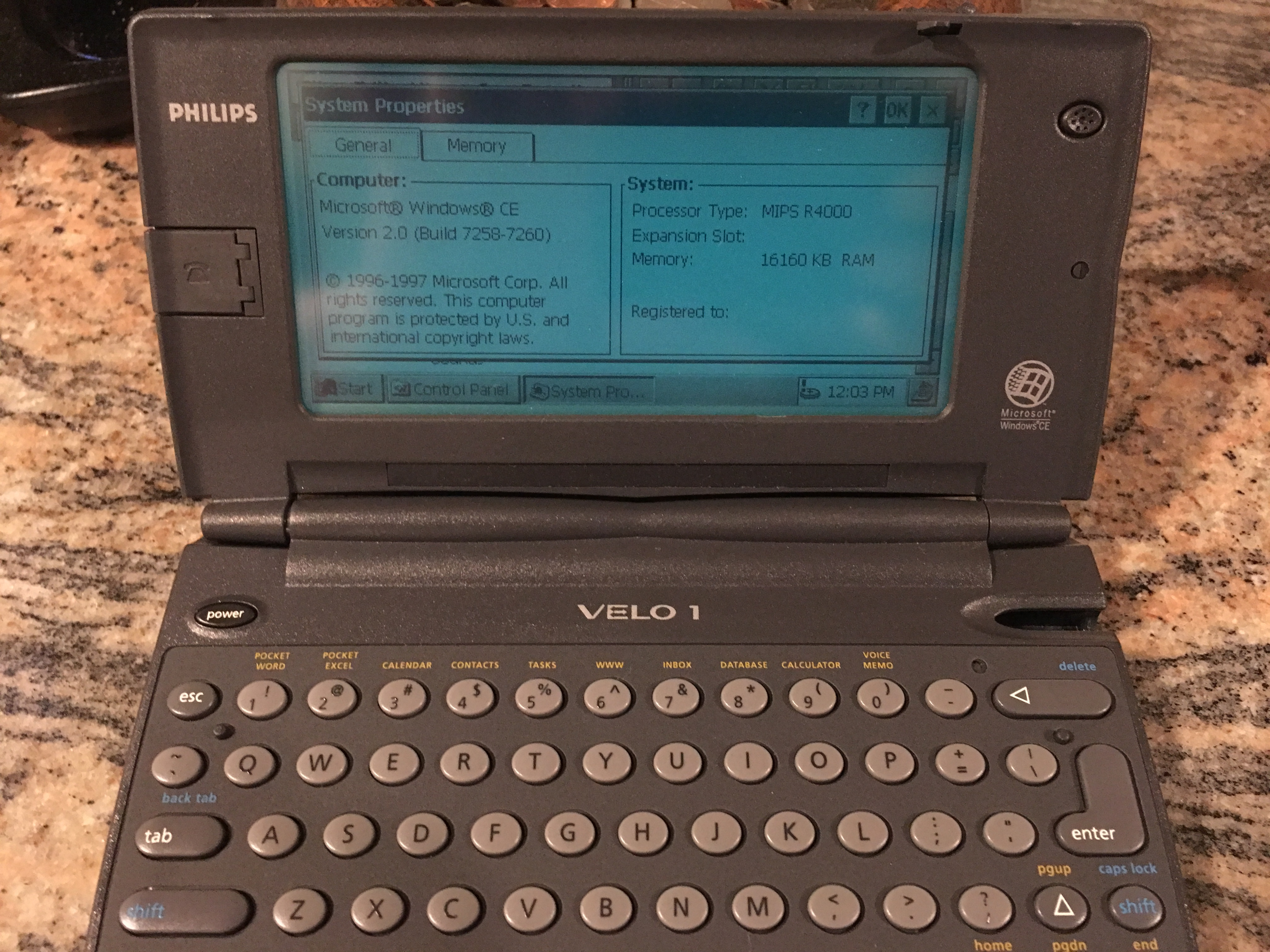
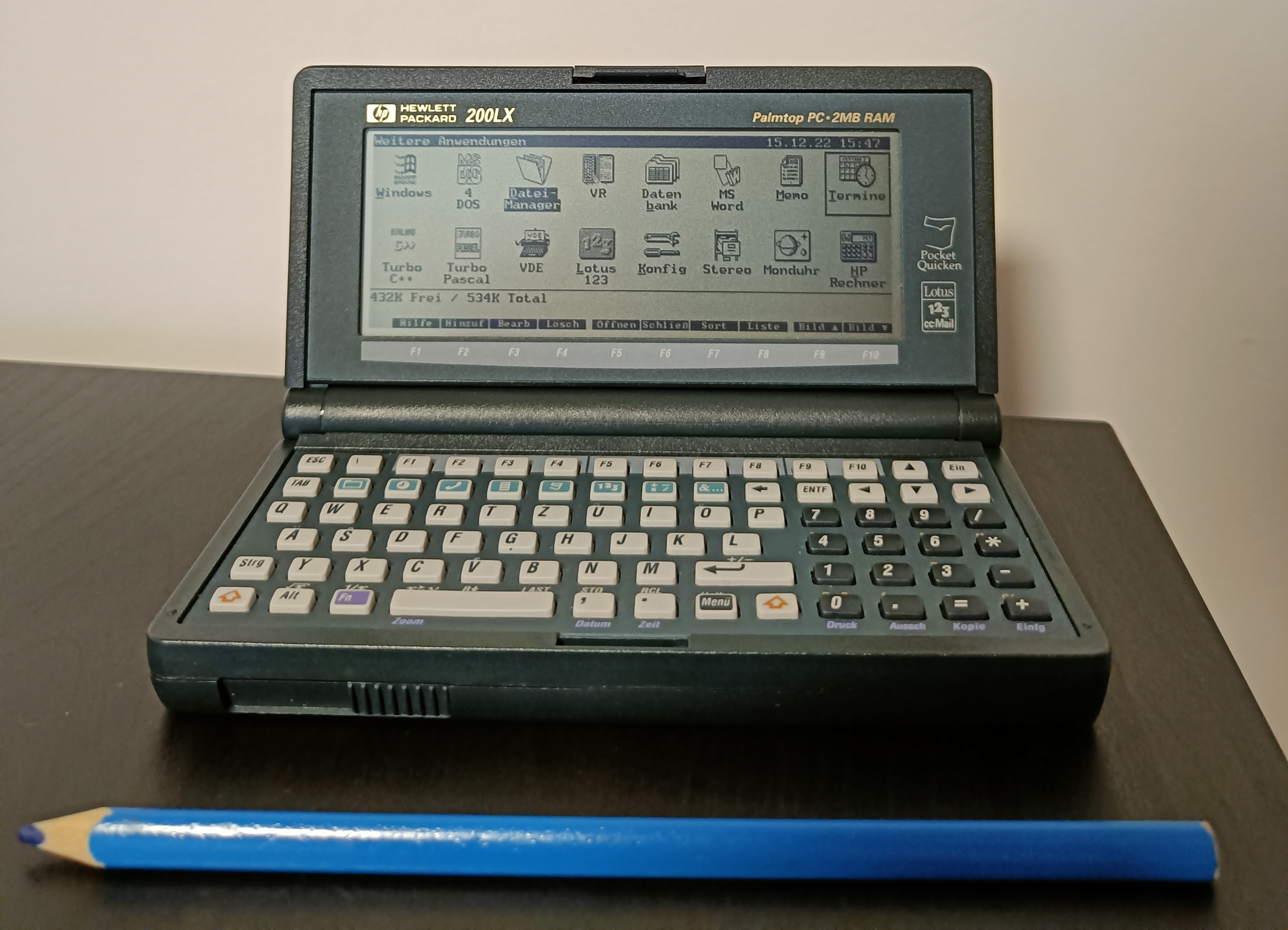
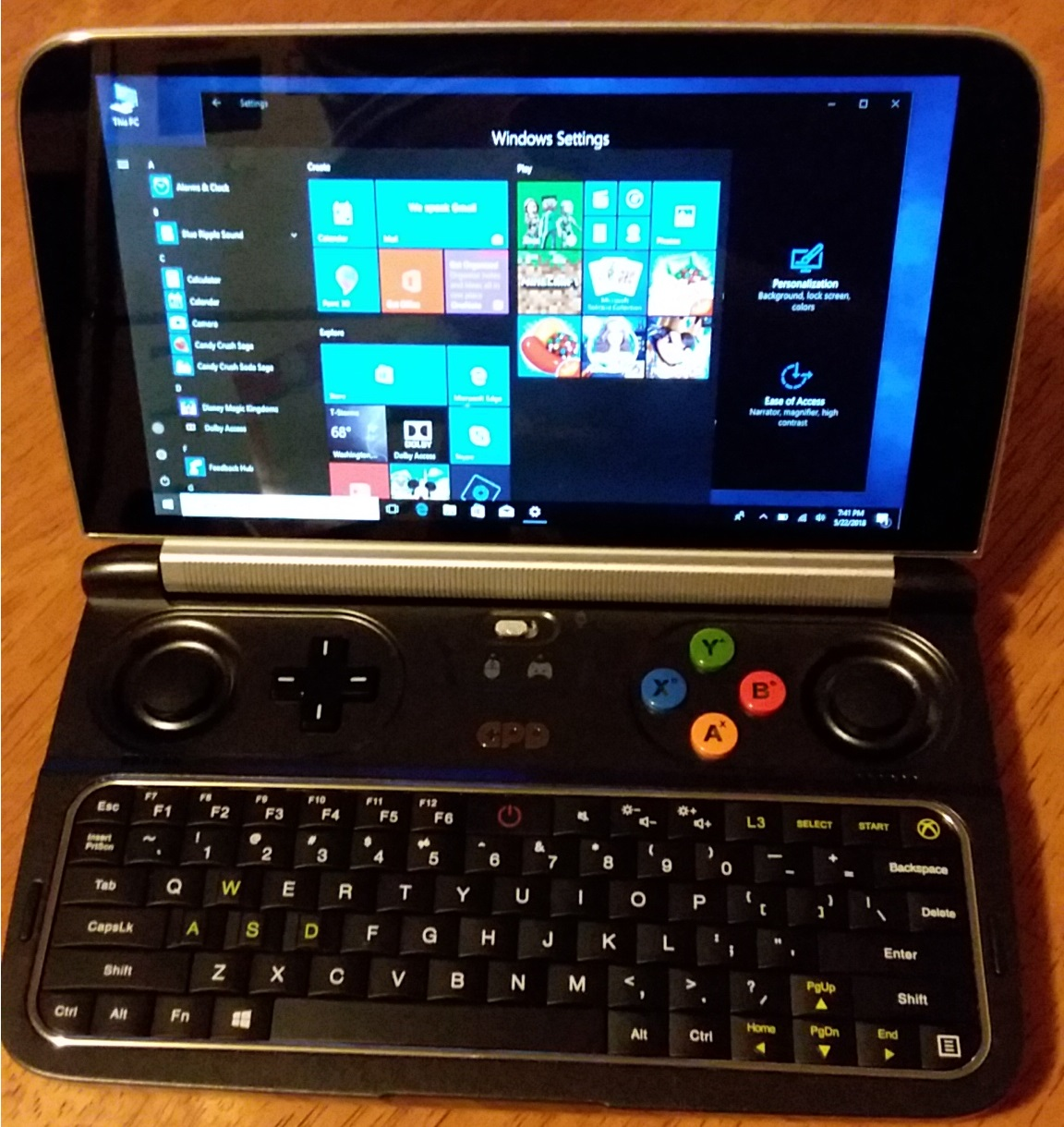
Various mobile devices described as handheld PCs, clockwise from top-left:
Sony Vaio UX Micro PC (ultra-mobile PC),
Philips Velo (Handheld PC),
GPD Win 2 (handheld gaming PC),
HP 200LX (Palmtop PC)

A handheld computer, also called a palmtop computer, is a term that has variously been used to describe a small-sized personal computer (PC) typically built around a clamshell form factor and a laptop-like keyboard, including: Palmtop PCs, personal digital assistants (PDA), ultra-mobile PCs (UMPC) or portable gaming PCs. The brand Handheld PC specifically is a now-defunct class of computers introduced in the 1990s that was marketed by Microsoft, and is detailed below.

== History and definitions ==
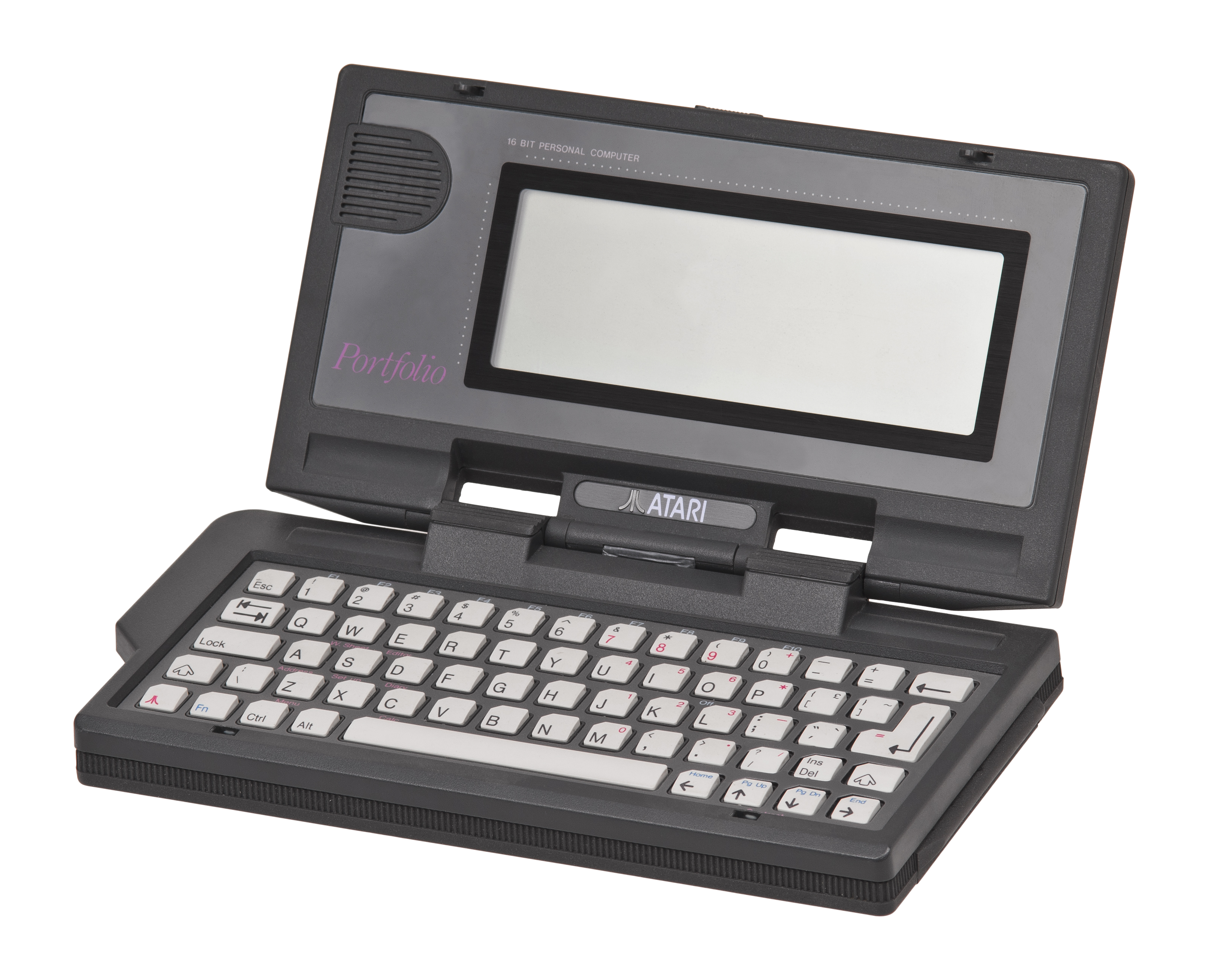
Atari Portfolio (1989)

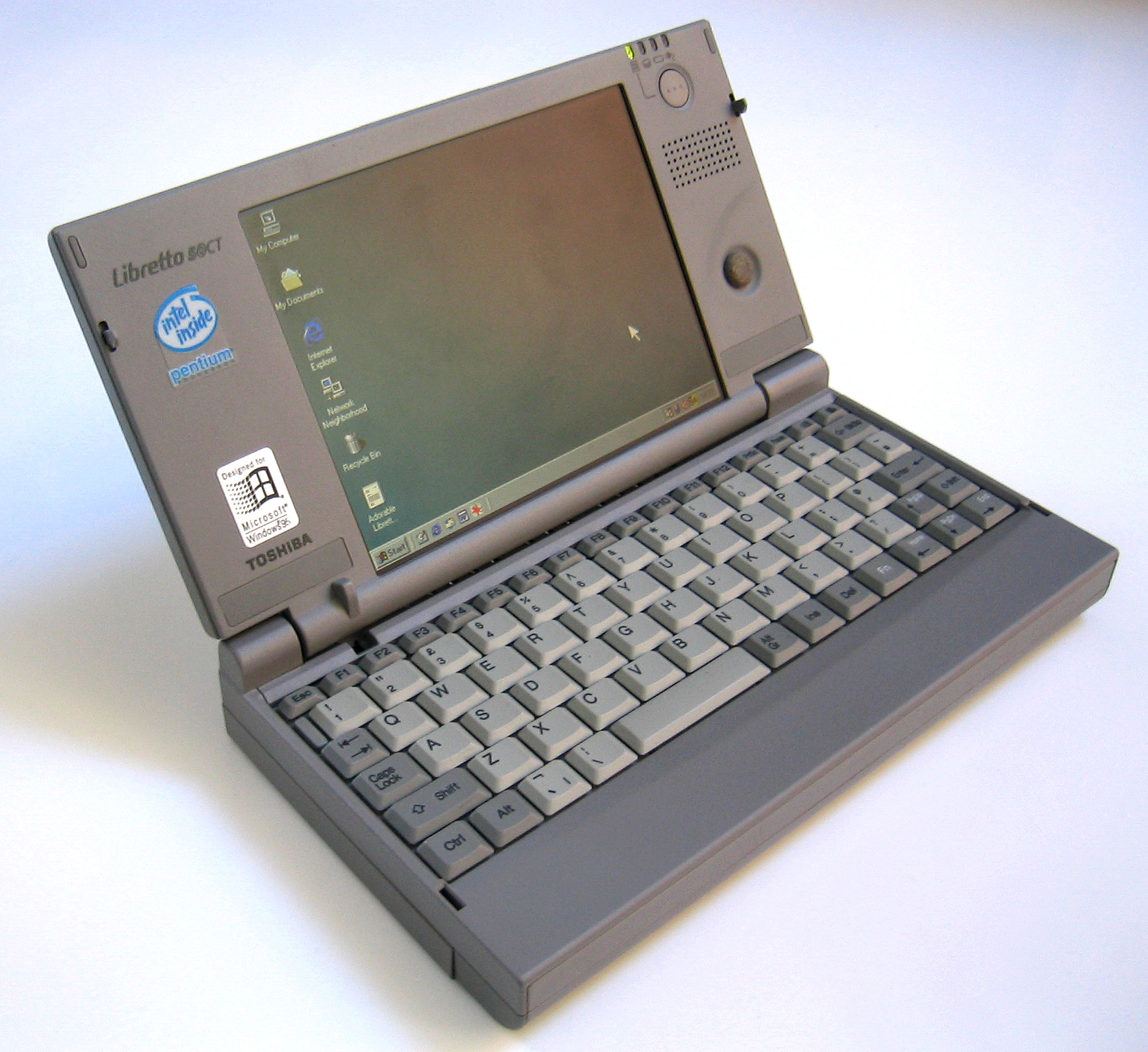
Toshiba Libretto 50CT (c. 1996), these subnotebooks have also been called a "palmtop" or "handheld" due to its size

The term has varying uses and has been intermixed with other terms. The first "hand-held" device compatible with desktop IBM personal computers of the time was the Atari Portfolio of 1989; such devices were often called "Palmtop PCs" at the time, as they were IBM PC–compatibles that could fit in the palm of a human hand. Other early models were the Poqet PC of 1989 and the Hewlett Packard HP 95LX of 1991 which run the MS-DOS operating system. Other DOS-compatible hand-held computers also existed. The popular definition of "handheld PC" eventually became a device bigger than a personal digital assistant (PDA) and with the addition of a keyboard that folds in half (making it more similar to a laptop rather than for example a cell phone) with both PDAs and handheld PCs considered under the umbrella "palmtop computer".

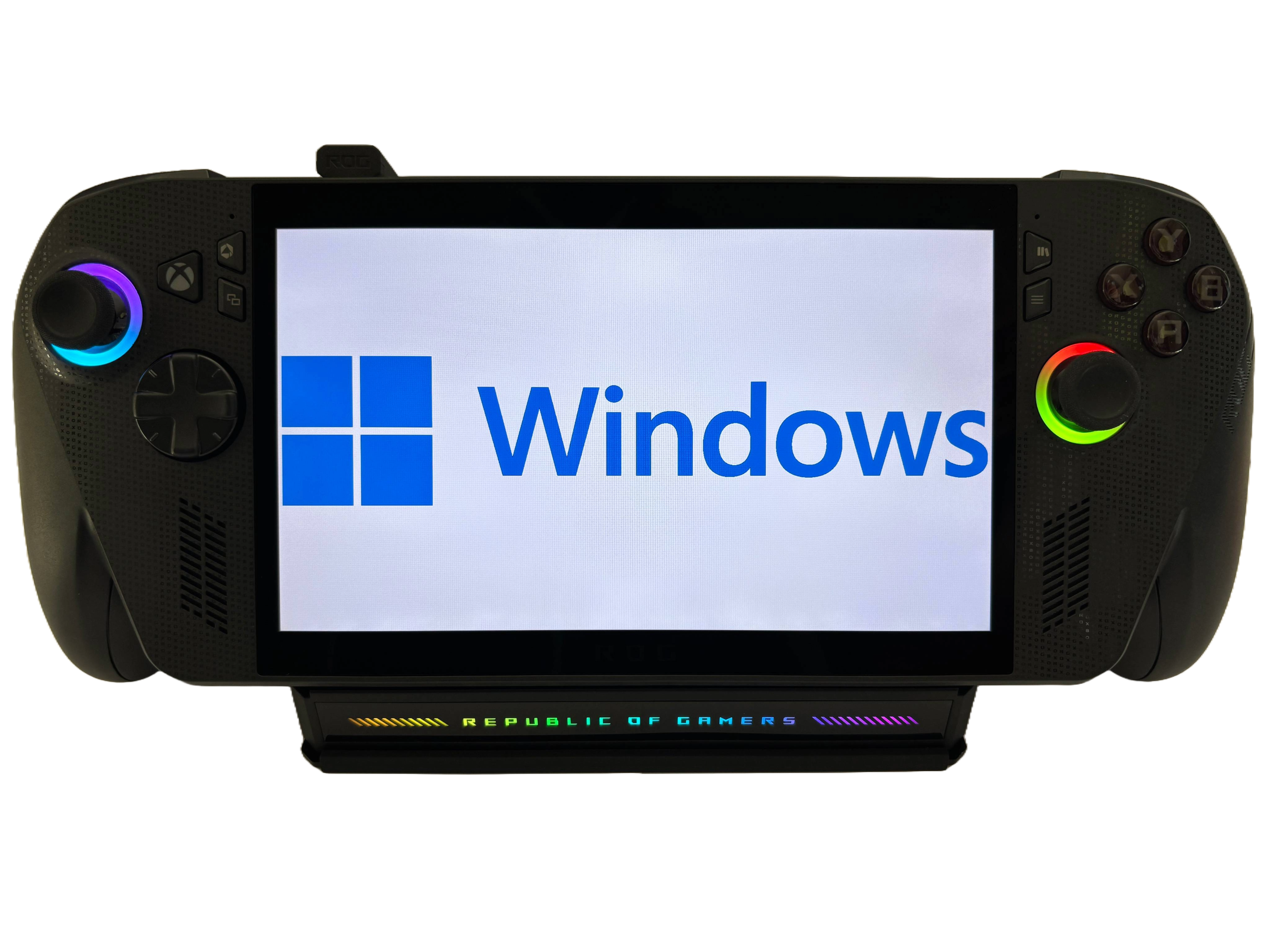
An ROG Xbox Ally handheld gaming PC (2023) has been referred to as a "handheld gaming PC" despite not having a keyboard.

After 2000, the handheld PC segment practically halted, replaced by other forms and continuing only as a niche, although later communicators such as Nokia E90 or Toshiba Portégé G910 can be considered to be of the same class. On the other hand, ultra-compact laptops capable of running common x86-compatible desktop operating systems have been typically classified as subnotebooks. Microsoft's ultra-mobile PC brought x86-based Windows — typically the modern definition of 'PC' — to palm sized mobile devices for the first time and these have also been referred to as handheld PCs. Other modern examples include handheld devices aimed at hobbyists, such as devices by GamePad Digital including the GPD Win, and the uConsole by ClockworkPi.

== Handheld gaming PCs ==
There have been various examples of handheld gaming PCs, which usually have a form factor similar to handheld game consoles, but utilize PC hardware and are capable of running PC games and applications rather than being restricted to a closed platform. In 2013, Razer Inc. released a Windows 8-based tablet known as the Razer Edge, which featured a dedicated GPU and a "GamePad" case accessory that added grips with gamepad controls to the sides of the tablet.

In 2021, Valve Corporation unveiled the Steam Deck, a handheld gaming PC with a more console-like design, an x86-64-based system-on-chip based on AMD's Zen 2 and RDNA 2 architectures, and the Linux-based SteamOS operating system. The device defaults to a console-like user experience, emphasizing access to games from Valve's Steam platform (with various emulation layers used to support Windows-based titles), and the ability for game developers to deploy Steam Deck-specific optimizations to games. Users can also exit the full-screen interface and access a desktop environment, which can be used to install and run standard software and games from outside of Steam.

The success of the Steam Deck influenced competing products from other vendors, such as the MSI Claw series, the Lenovo Legion Go, and the Asus ROG Ally and ROG Xbox Ally. These products typically run Windows instead of Linux; with the ROG Xbox Ally, Microsoft collaborated with Asus to add additional features to Windows 11 to optimize its user interface for handheld gaming PCs (including a SteamOS-like "Xbox mode"). Valve began to provide official support for SteamOS on competing handhelds such as the ROG Ally in 2024, while specialized Linux distributions (such as Bazzite) have also been developed to provide similar experiences to SteamOS.

== Microsoft Handheld PC ==
Handheld PC
- Developer: Microsoft
- Manufacturer: Various
- Type: Personal digital assistant, Subnotebook
- Lifespan: 1996–c. 2003
- Operating system: Windows CE
- Related: Pocket PC

The Handheld PC (H/PC) is a class of portable computers running Windows CE created and marketed by Microsoft. Introduced in 1996, the intent of Windows CE was to provide an environment for applications compatible with the Microsoft Windows operating system, on processors better suited to low-power operation in a portable device. These devices could run on the SH-3, MIPS, and later ARM processor architectures.

It provides the appointment calendar functions usual for any PDA. Microsoft was wary of using the term "PDA" for the Handheld PC. Instead, Microsoft marketed this type of device as a "PC companion". Its main competitor in the field was Psion with their Series 3 and Series 5.

=== Specifications ===
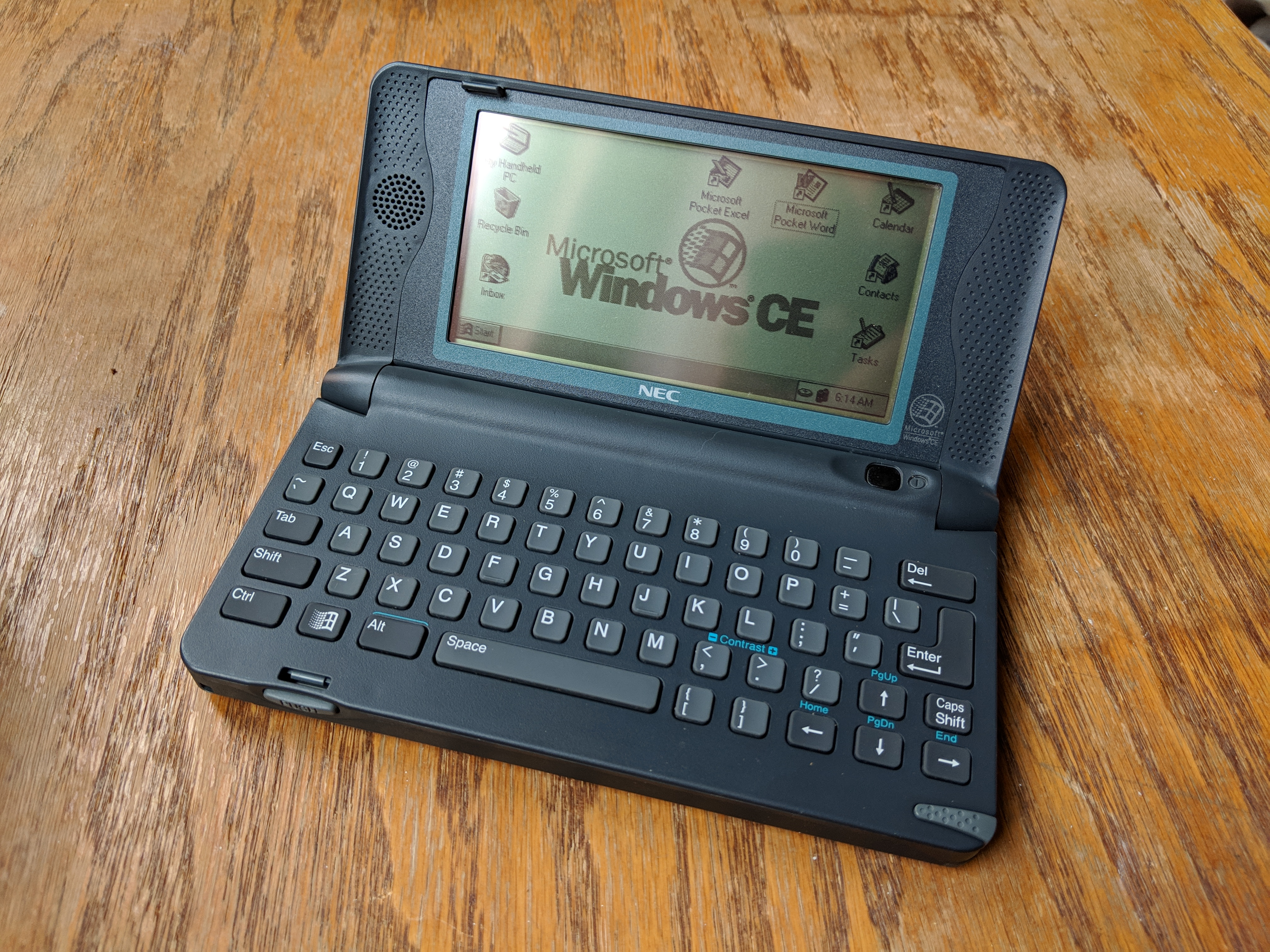
An NEC Handheld PC running Windows CE 1.0

To be classed as a Windows CE Handheld PC, the device must:

- Run Microsoft's Windows CE
- Be bundled with an application suite only found through an OEM Platform Release and not in Windows CE itself
- Use ROM
- Have a screen supporting a resolution of at least 480×240
- Include a keyboard (except tablet models)
- Include a PC card slot
- Include an infrared (IrDA) port
- Provide wired serial and/or Universal Serial Bus (USB) connectivity

=== Devices ===
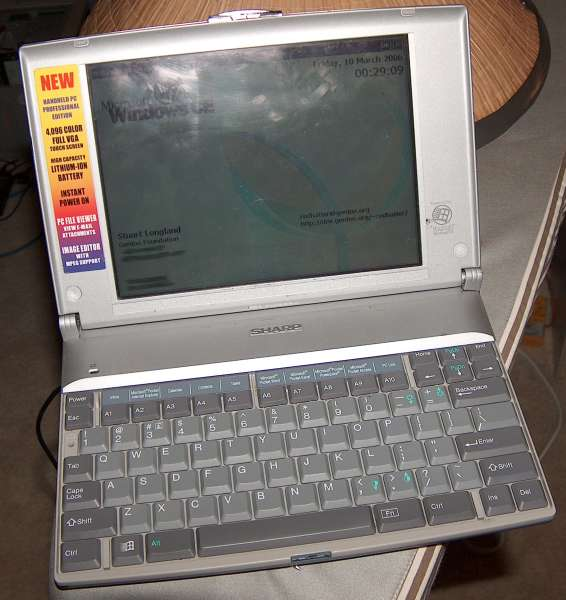
Sharp Mobilon PRO PV5000A, handheld PC running Windows CE 2.11 released in 1998

HP's first displays' widths were more than a third larger than that of Microsoft's specification. Soon, all of their competition followed. Examples of Handheld PC devices are the NEC MobilePro 900c, HP 320LX, Sharp Telios, HP Jornada 720, IBM WorkPad Z50, and Vadem Clio. Also included are tablet computers like the Fujitsu PenCentra 130, and even communicators like the late Samsung NEXiO S150.

=== Versions ===
The second generation of Handheld PCs were based on Windows CE 2.0. Improvements include color 640 x 240 resolution displays (the first generation devices only supported 480 x 240), taskbar customization, printer support, and the addition of Pocket PowerPoint to the Pocket Office suite. In October 1998, Handheld PC Professional based on Windows CE 2.11 was released with many enhancements under the hood, as well as full VGA display resolution. New hardware resembling subnotebooks were released on the market using this version.

In September 2000, the updated Handheld PC 2000 was announced which is based on version 3.0 of Windows CE.

Handheld PC version history
Handheld PC version	Windows CE version	Other platforms
Handheld PC	1.0	—
Handheld PC	2.0	Palm-size PC 1.0, Auto PC 1.0
Handheld PC Professional	2.11	Palm-size PC 1.1 / 1.2
Handheld PC 2000	3.0	Pocket PC 2000, Pocket PC 2002, Smartphone 2002

=== Reception ===
Handheld PC failed to be a success, being not so competitive against Palm's smaller and lighter keyboard-less Palm PDAs as well against subnotebook computers that were quickly dropping in price. The second version of the CE software failed to improve the situation. In October 1999, Philips announced that it will stop producing their Velo Handheld PC and stop using Windows CE entirely due to low sales. After 2000, with Microsoft attempting again with Handheld PC 2000, interest in the form factor overall quickly evaporated, and by early 2002 Microsoft were no longer working on Handheld PC, with its distinct functionality removed from version 4.0 of Windows CE. HP and Sharp both discontinued their Windows CE H/PCs in 2002, while NEC was last to leave the market. At the same time, notebook computers had become increasingly slimmer and portable, and the Handheld PC was increasingly limited by its Windows CE software in comparison. Due to limited success of Handheld PC, Microsoft focused more on the keyboard-less and smaller Pocket PC, which would run what would later be known as Windows Mobile.

== See also ==
- ActiveSync
- Handheld PC Explorer
- Handheld game console
- Netbook
- Nokia 9000 Communicator
- Nokia E90
- Palmtop PC
- Pandora (computer)
- Pocket PC
- Psion Teklogix
- Smartbook
- Sony CLIÉ UX Series
- Steam Deck
- Subnotebook
- Tablet computer
- uConsole
- Ryzen Z Series
