= GPD XD =

Handheld game console

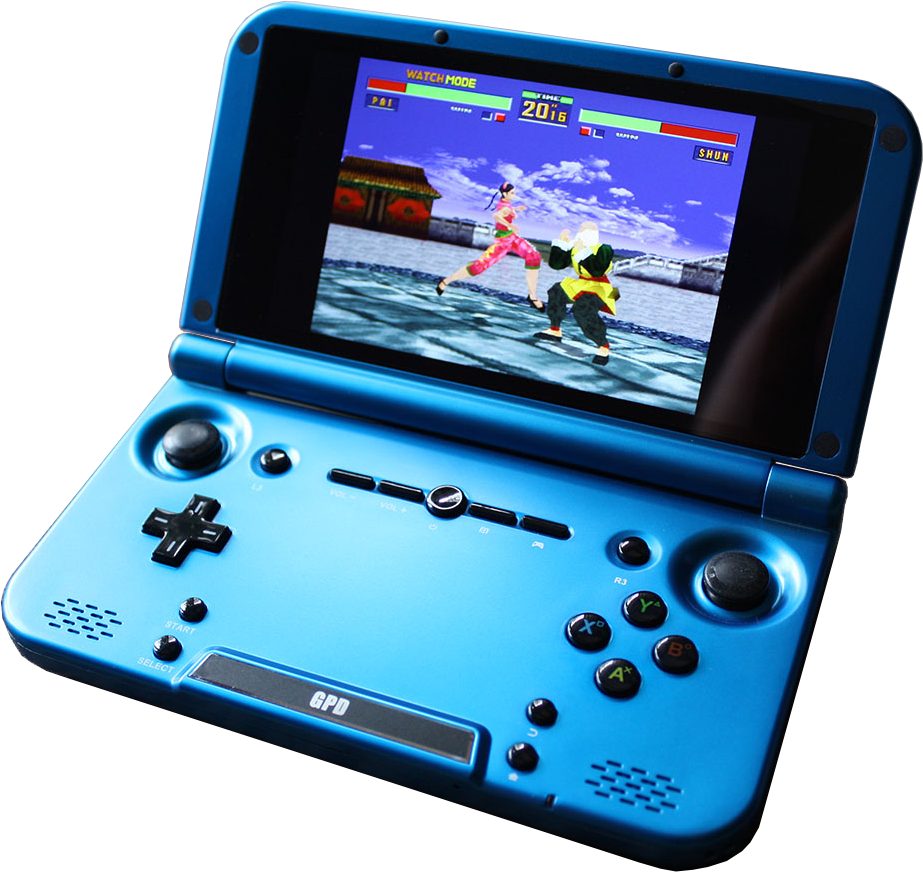
- GPD XD running Virtua Fighter 2 (uoYabause emulator)
- Manufacturer: GamePad Digital (GPD)
- Type: Handheld game console
- Released: October 2015
- Operating system: GPD XD: Android 4.4.4 "Kitkat" GPD XD Plus: Android 7 "Nougat"
- System on a chip: Rockchip RK3288
- CPU: ARM Cortex-A17 1.4GHz Quad-Core
- Memory: 2GB DDR3-SDRAM
- Storage: 16/32/64 GB ROM, 1 microSD slot (128GB max officially)
- Display: H-IPS 5.0" 1280×720, 720p Capacitive display, multi-touch support
- Graphics: ARM Mali-T764 600MHz
- Controller input: 2 analog control sticks, D-pad, 15 face buttons, 4 shoulder buttons
- Connectivity: Wi-Fi 802.11/b/g/n/ac (2.4 GHz), Micro USB, Mini HDMI, headphone port
- Dimensions: 155 × 89 × 24 mm (6.1 × 3.5 × 0.9 inches)
- Weight: 300g (0.7 lbs)
- Successor: GPD XD Plus
- Website: www.gpd.hk (English) www.softwincn.com (中文)

GPD XD is an Android-based handheld game console produced by the Chinese company GamePad Digital, released in late 2015. It is similar in form to a Nintendo 3DS XL, has a single, capacitive touch-screen, and is optimized for running emulators and other native Android software.

== Software ==
Android 4.4.4 is installed as standard, including a Metro-inspired launcher, game emulators and apps. The stock system software can be replaced with newer, community-based versions such as LegacyROM, removing unnecessary or infringing apps, adding Google Play, improving the performance of some emulators and enabling root access as well as overclocking to 1.8GHz.

A virtual control mapper utility is included in all versions of the system software, allowing the use of the physical controls with games that do not natively support them.

== Hardware ==
The GPD XD contains a Rockchip RK3288 SoC, which consists of an ARM Cortex-A17 clocked at 1.4 GHz, paired with the Mali-T764, which is clocked at 600 MHz. This allows the XD to be used for native 3D accelerated Android games as well as emulation, which is the device's main selling point. The device's power allows it to emulate systems up to the Sega Dreamcast and Nintendo DS, albeit with varying levels of quality. The system also has 2 GB of DDR3-SDRAM and a 720p display.

== See also ==
- GamePad Digital
- GPD Win
- GPD Win 2
- GPD Win Max
- Handheld gaming
