= GPD Win 4 =

Handheld Windows gaming computer

- Manufacturer: GamePad Digital (GPD)
- Product family: GPD Win
- Type: Handheld game console / Ultra-mobile PC / Palmtop
- Released: January 2021; 5 years ago
- Operating system: Windows 11 / SteamOS
- CPU: AMD Ryzen 7 6800U, AMD Ryzen 5 7640U, AMD Ryzen 7 7840U, AMD Ryzen 5 8640U, AMD Ryzen 7 8840U, AMD Ryzen AI 9 HX 370
- Memory: 16-32GB LPDDR5x 6400 RAM, 16-64GB LPDDR5x 7500 RAM
- Storage: 512GB-4TB SSD (replaceable)
- Removable storage: MicroSDXC
- Display: 6", 1920×1080, 16:9 10-point touch screen
- Graphics: AMD Radeon 680M/760M/780M/890M
- Controller input
- Touchpad: 3-point, one button
- Connectivity: Wi-Fi 6, Bluetooth 5.2, USB 40Gbps USB-C, USB 10Gbps USB-C, HDMI (through dock), 3.5mm Headphone/Microphone
- Power: 11849 mAh / 45.62 Wh
- Dimensions: 220 mm × 92 mm × 28 mm (8.7 in × 3.6 in × 1.1 in)
- Weight: 598 g (1.3 lbs)
- Predecessor: GPD Win 3
- Related: GPD Win Max, GPD Win Mini
- Website: www.gpd.hk (English) www.softwincn.com (中文)

The GPD Win 4 is a Windows-based palmtop computer that is the successor to the GPD Win 3. It is manufactured by Chinese company GamePad Digital (GPD) and was crowdfunded.

== History ==
Following the GPD Win 3, GPD announced the GPD Win 4 in September 2022.

The Indiegogo campaign started in December 2022 and fulfilled initial orders March 2023.

== Performance ==
The GPD Win 4 can run Elden Ring at 1080p60 with Medium settings.

== Specifications ==
Category	Specification			
Launch date	March 2023	August 2023	2024	2025
Dimensions	220 by 92 by 28 millimetres (8.7 in × 3.6 in × 1.1 in) 598 grams (1.318 lb)			
CPU	AMD Ryzen 7 6800U (2.7/4.7GHz boost)	AMD Ryzen 5 7640U(3.3/4.9GHz boost) or AMD Ryzen 7 7840U(3.3/5.1GHz boost)	AMD Ryzen 5 8640U(3.5/4.9GHz boost) or AMD Ryzen 7 8840U(3.3/5.1GHz boost)	AMD Ryzen 7 8840U(3.3/5.1GHz boost) or AMD Ryzen AI 9 HX 370 (2/5.1GHz boost)
Graphics	Radeon 680M	Radeon 760M or Radeon 780M	Radeon 760M or Radeon 780M	Radeon 780M or Radeon 890M
Memory	16/32GiB LPDDR5 6400	16GiB or 32/64GiB LPDDR5X 7500	16/32/64GiB LPDDR5X 7500	32GiB LPDDR5X 7500
Storage	1TiB or 2TiB M.2 NVMe solid-state drive	512GiB or 2TiB M.2 NVMe solid-state drive	512GiB or 2/4TiB M.2 NVMe solid-state drive	1TiB or 2TiB M.2 NVMe solid-state drive
Storage	MicroSD A2 removable storage No capacity ceilings			
Display	6" 1920x1080, H-IPS 60Hz 10-point touch screen, 4K video support (4096x2304x24 max) on USB-C/USB4, Miracast, and WiDi support			
Audio	Dual speakers 3.5mm audio Internal microphone Realtek audio driver			
Keyboard	Sliding full QWERTY keyboard with backlit dome-switch keys			
Game controls	D-pad 4 face ABXY buttons 2 shoulder L1/R1 buttons 2 analog L2/R2 triggers 2 analog sticks with L3/R3 buttons 2 L4/R4 buttons above keyboard 2 linear vibration motors 3-axis gyroscope 3-axis g-sensor			
Slots	A2 microSD slot M-key M.2 PCIe4 x4			
Ports	USB 40Gbps USB-C; USB 10Gbps USB-C; 3.5mm Headphone & Microphone Combo Jack			
Battery	45.62Wh lithium polymer battery USB Power Delivery charging			
Connectivity	WiFi 6 (2402 Mbit/s max rate); Bluetooth 5.2		WiFi 6E 2×2, MU-MIMO; Bluetooth 5.3	
Software	Windows 11 Home SteamOS			

== See also ==
- Comparison of handheld game consoles
- GPD Win 3
- GPD XD
- PC gaming
- Handheld game console
