= List of AMD Ryzen processors =

Microprocessors of the Ryzen brand are a line of x86-64 microprocessors manufactured by AMD, based on the Zen microarchitecture. Ryzen microprocessors include: Ryzen 3, Ryzen 5, Ryzen 7, Ryzen 9, and Ryzen Threadripper (with up to 96 cores). All consumer desktop Ryzens (except PRO models), as well as all mobile processors with the HX suffix, have an unlocked multiplier. In addition, all Ryzen microprocessors support Simultaneous Multithreading (SMT), except for earlier Zen/Zen+ based desktop and mobile Ryzen 3 processors, and some models of the Zen 2 mobile Ryzen microprocessor.

== Desktop processors ==
=== Ryzen 1000 series ===
==== Summit Ridge (1000 series, Zen based) ====
Common features of Ryzen 1000 desktop CPUs:

- Socket: AM4.
- All the CPUs support DDR4-2666 in dual-channel mode.
- All the CPUs support 24 PCIe 3.0 lanes. 4 of the lanes are reserved as link to the chipset.
- No integrated graphics.
- L1 cache: 96 KB (32 KB data + 64 KB instruction) per core.
- L2 cache: 512 KB per core.
- Node/fabrication process: GlobalFoundries 14 LP.

Branding and Model		Cores (threads)	Clock rate (GHz)			L3 cache (total)	TDP	Core config (Note: Core Complexes (CCX) × cores per CCX)	Thermal Solution	Release date	Launch price (Note: Manufacturer suggested retail price at launch)
Branding and Model		Cores (threads)	Base	PBO 1–2 (≥3)	XFR 1–2	L3 cache (total)	TDP	Core config	Thermal Solution	Release date	Launch price
Ryzen 7	1800X	8 (16)	3.6	4.0 (3.7)	4.1	16 MB	95 W	2 × 4	Wraith Max	March 2, 2017	US $499
Ryzen 7	1700X PRO	8 (16)	3.4	3.8 (3.5)	3.9	16 MB	95 W	2 × 4	—N/a	June 29, 2017	OEM
Ryzen 7	1700X	8 (16)	3.4	3.8 (3.5)	3.9	16 MB	95 W	2 × 4	Wraith Max	March 2, 2017	US $399
Ryzen 7	1700 PRO	8 (16)	3.0	3.7 (3.2)	3.75	16 MB	65 W	2 × 4	—N/a	June 29, 2017	OEM
Ryzen 7	1700	8 (16)	3.0	3.7 (3.2)	3.75	16 MB	65 W	2 × 4	Wraith Spire	March 2, 2017	US $329
Ryzen 5	1600X	6 (12)	3.6	4.0 (3.7)	4.1	16 MB	95 W	2 × 3	Wraith Max	April 11, 2017	US $249
Ryzen 5	1600 PRO	6 (12)	3.2	3.6 (3.4)	3.7	16 MB	65 W	2 × 3	—N/a	June 29, 2017	OEM
Ryzen 5	1600	6 (12)	3.2	3.6 (3.4)	3.7	16 MB	65 W	2 × 3	Wraith Stealth	April 11, 2017	US $219
Ryzen 5	1500X	4 (8)	3.5	3.7 (3.6)	3.9	16 MB	65 W	2 × 2	Wraith Spire (No LED)	April 11, 2017	US $189
Ryzen 5	1500 PRO	4 (8)	3.5	3.7 (3.6)	3.9	16 MB	65 W	2 × 2	—N/a	June 29, 2017	OEM
Ryzen 5	1400	4 (8)	3.2	3.4 (3.4)	3.45	8 MB	65 W	2 × 2	Wraith Stealth	April 11, 2017	US $169
Ryzen 3	1300X	4 (4)	3.5	3.7 (3.5)	3.9	8 MB	65 W	2 × 2	Wraith Stealth	July 27, 2017	US $129
Ryzen 3	1300 PRO	4 (4)	3.5	3.7 (3.5)	3.9	8 MB	65 W	2 × 2	—N/a	June 29, 2017	OEM
Ryzen 3	1200 PRO	4 (4)	3.1	3.4 (3.1)	3.45	8 MB	65 W	2 × 2	—N/a	June 29, 2017	OEM
Ryzen 3	1200	4 (4)	3.1	3.4 (3.1)	3.45	8 MB	65 W	2 × 2	Wraith Stealth	July 27, 2017	US $109

==== Whitehaven (Threadripper 1000 series, Zen based) ====
Common features of Ryzen 1000 HEDT CPUs:

- Socket: TR4.
- All the CPUs support DDR4-2666 in quad-channel mode.
- All the CPUs support 64 PCIe 3.0 lanes. 4 of the lanes are reserved as link to the chipset.
- No integrated graphics.
- L1 cache: 96 KB (32 KB data + 64 KB instruction) per core.
- L2 cache: 512 KB per core.
- Node/fabrication process: GlobalFoundries 14LP.

Branding and Model		Cores (threads)	Clock rate (GHz)			L3 cache (total)	TDP	Chiplets	Core config (Note: Core Complexes (CCX) × cores per CCX)	Release date	Launch price (Note: Manufacturer suggested retail price at launch)
Branding and Model		Cores (threads)	Base	PBO 1–4 (≥5)	XFR 1–2	L3 cache (total)	TDP	Chiplets	Core config	Release date	Launch price
Ryzen Threadripper	1950X	16 (32)	3.4	4.0 (3.7)	4.2	32 MB	180 W	2 × CCD (Note: Processor package actually contains two additional inactive dies to provide structural support to the integrated heat spreader.)	4 × 4	August 10, 2017	US $999
Ryzen Threadripper	1920X	12 (24)	3.5	4.0 (3.7)	4.2	32 MB	180 W	2 × CCD	4 × 3	August 10, 2017	US $799
Ryzen Threadripper	1900X	8 (16)	3.8	4.0 (3.9)	4.2	16 MB	180 W	2 × CCD	2 × 4	August 31, 2017	US $549

=== Ryzen 2000 series ===
==== Raven Ridge (2000 series with Radeon Graphics, Zen/GCN5 based) ====
Common features of Ryzen 2000 desktop APUs:

- Socket: AM4.
- All the CPUs support DDR4-2933 in dual-channel mode.
- All the CPUs support 16 PCIe 3.0 lanes. 4 of the lanes are reserved as link to the chipset.
- Includes integrated GCN 5th generation GPU.
- L1 cache: 96 KB (32 KB data + 64 KB instruction) per core.
- L2 cache: 512 KB per core.
- Fabrication process: GlobalFoundries 14LP.

Branding and Model		CPU				GPU				TDP	Release date	Launch MSRP
Branding and Model		Cores (threads)	Clock rate (GHz)		L3 cache (total)	Model	Clock (GHz)	Config (Note: Unified Shaders : Texture Mapping Units : Render Output Units and Compute Units (CU))	Processing power (GFLOPS) (Note: Single-precision performance is calculated from the base (or boost) core clock speed based on a FMA operation.)	TDP	Release date	Launch MSRP
Branding and Model		Cores (threads)	Base	Boost	L3 cache (total)	Model	Clock (GHz)	Config	Processing power (GFLOPS)	TDP	Release date	Launch MSRP
Ryzen 5	2400G (Note: Model also available as PRO version; 2200GE, 2200G, 2400GE, 2400G, released on May 14, 2018 for OEM only.)	4 (8)	3.6	3.9	4 MB	RX Vega 11	1.25	704:44:16; 11 CU	1760	46–65 W	February 12, 2018	US $169
Ryzen 5	2400GE	4 (8)	3.2	3.8	4 MB	RX Vega 11	1.25	704:44:16; 11 CU	1760	35 W	April 19, 2018	OEM
Ryzen 3	2200G	4 (4)	3.5	3.7	4 MB	Vega 8	1.1	512:32:16; 8 CU	1126	46–65 W	February 12, 2018	US $99
Ryzen 3	2200GE	4 (4)	3.2	3.6	4 MB	Vega 8	1.1	512:32:16; 8 CU	1126	35 W	April 19, 2018	OEM
Ryzen 3	PRO 2100GE	2 (4)	3.2	—N/a	4 MB	Vega 3	1.0	192:12:4; 3 CU	384	35 W	2019	OEM

==== Pinnacle Ridge (2000 series, Zen+ based) ====
Common features of Ryzen 2000 desktop CPUs:

- Socket: AM4.
- All the CPUs support DDR4-2933 in dual-channel mode, except for R7 2700E, R5 2600E, R5 1600AF and R3 1200AF which support it at DDR4-2666 speeds.
- All the CPUs support 24 PCIe 3.0 lanes. 4 of the lanes are reserved as link to the chipset.
- No integrated graphics.
- L1 cache: 96 KB (32 KB data + 64 KB instruction) per core.
- L2 cache: 512 KB per core.
- Fabrication process: GlobalFoundries 12LP (14LP+).

Branding and Model		Cores (threads)	Clock rate (GHz)		L3 cache (total)	TDP	Core config (Note: Core Complexes (CCX) × cores per CCX)	Thermal Solution	Release date	Launch price (Note: Manufacturer suggested retail price at launch)
Branding and Model		Cores (threads)	Base	PB2	L3 cache (total)	TDP	Core config	Thermal Solution	Release date	Launch price
Ryzen 7	2700X (Note: Model also available as PRO version as 2600, 2700, 2700X, released on September 19, 2018.)	8 (16)	3.7	4.3	16 MB	105 W	2 × 4	Wraith Prism	April 19, 2018	US $329
Ryzen 7	2700	8 (16)	3.2	4.1	16 MB	65 W	2 × 4	Wraith Spire	April 19, 2018	US $299
Ryzen 7	2700E	8 (16)	2.8	4.0	16 MB	45 W	2 × 4	—N/a	September 19, 2018	OEM
Ryzen 5	2600X	6 (12)	3.6	4.2	16 MB	95 W	2 × 3	Wraith Spire	April 19, 2018	US $229
Ryzen 5	2600	6 (12)	3.4	3.9	16 MB	65 W	2 × 3	Wraith Stealth	April 19, 2018	US $199
Ryzen 5	2600E	6 (12)	3.1	4.0	16 MB	45 W	2 × 3	—N/a	September 19, 2018	OEM
Ryzen 5	1600 (AF) (Note: AF models are 12 nm Zen+ refresh of 14 nm Zen models (1200 and 1600 with "AF" instead of "AE" in the part numbers). AMD officially considers these CPUs as part of the 1000 Series.)	6 (12)	3.2	3.6	16 MB	65 W	2 × 3	Wraith Stealth	October 11, 2019	US $85
Ryzen 5	2500X	4 (8)	3.6	4.0	8 MB	65 W	1 × 4	—N/a	September 10, 2018	OEM
Ryzen 3	2300X	4 (4)	3.5	4.0	8 MB	65 W	1 × 4	—N/a	September 10, 2018	OEM
Ryzen 3	1200 (AF)	4 (4)	3.1	3.4	8 MB	65 W	1 × 4	Wraith Stealth	April 21, 2020	US $60

==== Colfax (Threadripper 2000 series, Zen+ based) ====
Common features of Ryzen 2000 HEDT CPUs:

- Socket: TR4.
- All the CPUs support DDR4-2933 in quad-channel mode.
- All the CPUs support 64 PCIe 3.0 lanes. 4 of the lanes are reserved as link to the chipset.
- No integrated graphics.
- L1 cache: 96 KB (32 KB data + 64 KB instruction) per core.
- L2 cache: 512 KB per core.
- Fabrication process: GlobalFoundries 12LP (14LP+).

Branding and Model		Cores (threads)	Clock rate (GHz)		L3 cache (total)	TDP	Chiplets	Core config (Note: Core Complexes (CCX) × cores per CCX)	Release date	Launch price (Note: Manufacturer suggested retail price at launch)
Branding and Model		Cores (threads)	Base	PB2	L3 cache (total)	TDP	Chiplets	Core config	Release date	Launch price
Ryzen Threadripper	2990WX	32 (64)	3.0	4.2	64 MB	250 W	4 × CCD	8 × 4	Aug 13, 2018	US $1799
Ryzen Threadripper	2970WX	24 (48)	3.0	4.2	64 MB	250 W	4 × CCD	8 × 3	Oct 2018	US $1299
Ryzen Threadripper	2950X	16 (32)	3.5	4.4	32 MB	180 W	2 × CCD	4 × 4	Aug 31, 2018	US $899
Ryzen Threadripper	2920X	12 (24)	3.5	4.3	32 MB	180 W	2 × CCD	4 × 3	Oct 2018	US $649

=== Ryzen 3000 series ===
==== Picasso (3000 series with Radeon Graphics, Zen+/GCN5 based) ====
Common features of Ryzen 3000 desktop APUs:

- Socket: AM4.
- All the CPUs support DDR4-2933 in dual-channel mode.
- L1 cache: 96 KB (32 KB data + 64 KB instruction) per core.
- L2 cache: 512 KB per core.
- All the CPUs provide 20 PCIe 3.0, from which 4 are reserved as link to the chipset.
- Includes integrated GCN 5th generation GPU.
- Fabrication process: GlobalFoundries 12LP (14LP+).

Branding and Model		CPU				GPU				TDP	Release date	MSRP
Branding and Model		Cores (threads)	Clock rate (GHz)		L3 cache (total)	Model	Clock (GHz)	Config (Note: Unified shaders : Texture mapping units : Render output units and Compute units (CU))	Processing power (GFLOPS) (Note: Single-precision performance is calculated from the base (or boost) core clock speed based on a FMA operation.)	TDP	Release date	MSRP
Branding and Model		Cores (threads)	Base	Boost	L3 cache (total)	Model	Clock (GHz)	Config	Processing power (GFLOPS)	TDP	Release date	MSRP
Ryzen 5	PRO 3400G	4 (8)	3.7	4.2	4 MB	Radeon; RX Vega 11	1.4	704:44:8; 11 CU	1971.2	65 W	Sep 30, 2019	OEM
Ryzen 5	3400G (Note: Prior to August 1, 2025, included a Wraith Spire cooler. Starting August 1, 2025, includes a Wraith Stealth instead.)	4 (8)	3.7	4.2	4 MB	Radeon; RX Vega 11	1.4	704:44:8; 11 CU	1971.2	65 W	Jul 7, 2019	US $149
Ryzen 5	PRO 3400GE	4 (8)	3.3	4.0	4 MB	Radeon; RX Vega 11	1.3	704:44:8; 11 CU	1830.4	35 W	Sep 30, 2019	OEM
Ryzen 5	PRO 3350G	4 (8)	3.6	4.0	4 MB	Radeon; Vega 10	1.3	640:40:8; 10 CU	1664	65 W	Jul 21, 2020	OEM
Ryzen 5	PRO 3350GE	4 (4)	3.3	3.9	4 MB	Radeon; Vega 10	1.2	640:40:8; 10 CU	1536	35 W	Jul 21, 2020	OEM
Ryzen 3	PRO 3200G	4 (4)	3.6	4.0	4 MB	Radeon; Vega 8	1.25	512:32:8; 8 CU	1280	65 W	Sep 30, 2019	OEM
Ryzen 3	3200G	4 (4)	3.6	4.0	4 MB	Radeon; Vega 8	1.25	512:32:8; 8 CU	1280	65 W	Jul 7, 2019	US $99
Ryzen 3	3200GE	4 (4)	3.3	3.8	4 MB	Radeon; Vega 8	1.2	512:32:8; 8 CU	1228.8	35 W	Jul 7, 2019	OEM
Ryzen 3	PRO 3200GE	4 (4)	3.3	3.8	4 MB	Radeon; Vega 8	1.2	512:32:8; 8 CU	1228.8	35 W	Sep 30, 2019	OEM

==== Matisse (3000 series, Zen 2 based) ====
Common features of Ryzen 3000 desktop CPUs:

- Socket: AM4.
- All the CPUs support DDR4-3200 in dual-channel mode.
- L1 cache: 64 KB (32 KB data + 32 KB instruction) per core.
- L2 cache: 512 KB per core.
- All the CPUs support 24 PCIe 4.0 lanes. 4 of which are reserved as link to the chipset.
- No integrated graphics.
- Fabrication process: TSMC 7FF.

Branding and Model		Cores (threads)	Clock rate (GHz)		L3 cache (total)	TDP	Chiplets (Note: A Core Complex Die contains 1-2 Core Complexes (CCXs).)	Core config (Note: Core Complexes (CCXs) × cores per CCX)	Thermal Solution	Release date	MSRP
Branding and Model		Cores (threads)	Base	Boost	L3 cache (total)	TDP	Chiplets	Core config	Thermal Solution	Release date	MSRP
Ryzen 9	3950X	16 (32)	3.5	4.7	64 MB	105 W (Note: Ryzen 9 3900X and Ryzen 9 3950X may consume over 145 W under load.)	2 × CCD; 1 × I/OD	4 × 4	—N/a	Nov 25, 2019	US $749
Ryzen 9	3900XT	12 (24)	3.8	4.7	64 MB	105 W	2 × CCD; 1 × I/OD	4 × 3	—N/a	Jul 7, 2020	US $499
Ryzen 9	3900X	12 (24)	3.8	4.6	64 MB	105 W	2 × CCD; 1 × I/OD	4 × 3	Wraith Prism	Jul 7, 2019	US $499
Ryzen 9	3900 (Note: Model also available as PRO 3600, PRO 3700, PRO 3900, released on September 30, 2019 for OEMs.)	12 (24)	3.1	4.3	64 MB	65 W	2 × CCD; 1 × I/OD	4 × 3	—N/a	Oct 8, 2019	OEM
Ryzen 7	3800XT	8 (16)	3.9	4.7	32 MB	105 W	1 × CCD; 1 × I/OD	2 × 4	—N/a	Jul 7, 2020	US $399
Ryzen 7	3800X	8 (16)	3.9	4.5	32 MB	105 W	1 × CCD; 1 × I/OD	2 × 4	Wraith Prism	Jul 7, 2019	US $399
Ryzen 7	3700X	8 (16)	3.6	4.4	32 MB	65 W (Note: Ryzen 7 3700X may consume 90 W under load.)	1 × CCD; 1 × I/OD	2 × 4	Wraith Prism	Jul 7, 2019	US $329
Ryzen 5	3600XT	6 (12)	3.8	4.5	32 MB	95 W	1 × CCD; 1 × I/OD	2 × 3	—N/a	Jul 7, 2020	US $249
Ryzen 5	3600X	6 (12)	3.8	4.4	32 MB	95 W	1 × CCD; 1 × I/OD	2 × 3	Wraith Spire (non-LED)	Jul 7, 2019	US $249
Ryzen 5	3600	6 (12)	3.6	4.2	32 MB	65 W	1 × CCD; 1 × I/OD	2 × 3	Wraith Stealth	Jul 7, 2019	US $199
Ryzen 5	3500X	6 (6)	3.6	4.1	32 MB	65 W	1 × CCD; 1 × I/OD	2 × 3	Wraith Stealth	Oct 8, 2019	CNY 1099 (Mainland China Only)
Ryzen 5	3500	6 (6)	3.6	4.1	16 MB	65 W	1 × CCD; 1 × I/OD	2 × 3	—N/a	Nov 15, 2019	OEM (Worldwide) JPY 16000 (Japan Only)
Ryzen 3	3300X	4 (8)	3.8	4.3	16 MB	65 W	1 × CCD; 1 × I/OD	1 × 4	Wraith Stealth	Apr 21, 2020	US $119
Ryzen 3	3100	4 (8)	3.6	3.9	16 MB	65 W	1 × CCD; 1 × I/OD	2 × 2	Wraith Stealth	Apr 21, 2020	US $99

==== Castle Peak (Threadripper 3000 series, Zen 2 based) ====
Common features of Ryzen 3000 HEDT/workstation CPUs:

- Socket: sTRX4 (Threadripper), sWRX8 (Threadripper PRO).
- Threadripper CPUs support DDR4-3200 in quad-channel mode while Threadripper PRO CPUs support DDR4-3200 in octa-channel mode.
- L1 cache: 64 KB (32 KB data + 32 KB instruction) per core.
- L2 cache: 512 KB per core.
- Threadripper CPUs support 64 PCIe 4.0 lanes while Threadripper PRO CPUs support 128 PCIe 4.0 lanes. 8 of the lanes are reserved as link to the chipset.
- No integrated graphics.
- Fabrication process: TSMC 7FF.

Branding and Model		Cores (threads)	Clock rate (GHz)		L3 cache (total)	TDP	Chiplets	Core config (Note: Core Complexes (CCXs) × cores per CCX)	Release date	MSRP
Branding and Model		Cores (threads)	Base	Boost	L3 cache (total)	TDP	Chiplets	Core config	Release date	MSRP
Ryzen Threadripper PRO	3995WX	64 (128)	2.7	4.2	256 MB	280 W (Note: Ryzen Threadripper 3990X may consume over 490 W under load.)	8 × CCD; 1 × I/OD	16 × 4	Jul 14, 2020	
Ryzen Threadripper PRO	3975WX	32 (64)	3.5	4.2	128 MB	280 W	4 × CCD; 1 × I/OD	8 × 4	Jul 14, 2020	
Ryzen Threadripper PRO	3955WX	16 (32)	3.9	4.3	64 MB	280 W	2 × CCD; 1 × I/OD	4 × 4	Jul 14, 2020	
Ryzen Threadripper PRO	3945WX	12 (24)	4.0	4.3	64 MB	280 W	2 × CCD; 1 × I/OD	4 × 3	Jul 14, 2020	
Ryzen Threadripper	3990X	64 (128)	2.9	4.3	256 MB	280 W	8 × CCD; 1 × I/OD	16 × 4	Feb 7, 2020	US $3990
Ryzen Threadripper	3970X	32 (64)	3.7	4.5	128 MB	280 W	4 × CCD; 1 × I/OD	8 × 4	Nov 25, 2019	US $1999
Ryzen Threadripper	3960X	24 (48)	3.8	4.5	128 MB	280 W	4 × CCD; 1 × I/OD	8 × 3	Nov 25, 2019	US $1399

=== Ryzen 4000 series ===
==== Renoir (4000 series, Zen 2 based) ====
Based on the Ryzen 4000G series APUs with the integrated GPU disabled. Common features of Ryzen 4000 desktop CPUs:

- Socket: AM4.
  - The AMD 4700S uses the BGA 2197 socket and the 4800S uses BGA 2963.
- All the CPUs support DDR4-3200 in dual-channel mode.
- L1 cache: 64 KB (32 KB data + 32 KB instruction) per core.
- L2 cache: 512 KB per core.
- All the CPUs support 24 PCIe 3.0 lanes. 4 of the lanes are reserved as link to the chipset.
- No integrated graphics.
- Fabrication process: TSMC 7FF.
- Bundled with AMD Wraith Stealth

The AMD 4700S and 4800S desktop processors are part of a "desktop kit" that comes bundled with a motherboard and GDDR6 RAM. The CPU is soldered, and provides 4 PCIe 2.0 lanes. These are reportedly cut-down variants of the APUs found on the PlayStation 5 and Xbox Series X and S repurposed from defective chip stock.

Branding and model		Cores (threads)	Clock rate (GHz)		L3 cache (total)	TDP	Core config (Note: Core Complexes (CCX) × cores per CCX)	Release date	MSRP
Branding and model		Cores (threads)	Base	Boost	L3 cache (total)	TDP	Core config	Release date	MSRP
AMD	4800S	8 (16)	3.6	4.0	8 MB		2 × 4	2022	bundled with desktop kit
AMD	4700S	8 (16)	3.6	4.0	8 MB	75 W	2 × 4	2021	bundled with desktop kit
Ryzen 7	4700LE	8 (16)	3.6	4.2	8 MB	65 W	2 × 4	Mar 25, 2026	OEM
Ryzen 5	4500	6 (12)	3.6	4.1	8 MB	65 W	2 × 3	Apr 4, 2022	US $129
Ryzen 3	4100	4 (8)	3.8	4.0	4 MB	65 W	1 × 4	Apr 4, 2022	US $99

==== Renoir (4000 series with Radeon Graphics, Zen 2/GCN5.1 based) ====
Common features of Ryzen 4000 desktop APUs:

- Socket: AM4.
- All the CPUs support DDR4-3200 in dual-channel mode.
- L1 cache: 64 KB (32 KB data + 32 KB instruction) per core.
- L2 cache: 512 KB per core.
- All the CPUs support 24 PCIe 3.0 lanes. 4 of the lanes are reserved as link to the chipset.
- Includes integrated GCN 5th generation GPU.
- Fabrication process: TSMC 7FF.

Branding and model		CPU					GPU				TDP	Release date	Release price
Branding and model		Cores (threads)	Clock rate (GHz)		L3 cache (total)	Core Config (Note: Core complexes (CCXs) × cores per CCX)	Model	Clock (GHz)	Config (Note: Unified shaders : Texture mapping units : Render output units and Compute units (CU))	Processing power (Note: Single-precision performance is calculated from the base (or boost) core clock speed based on a FMA operation.) (GFLOPS)	TDP	Release date	Release price
Branding and model		Cores (threads)	Base	Boost	L3 cache (total)	Core Config	Model	Clock (GHz)	Config	Processing power (GFLOPS)	TDP	Release date	Release price
Ryzen 7	4700G (Note: Model also available as PRO version as 4350GE, 4350G, 4650GE, 4650G, 4750GE, 4750G, released on July 21, 2020 for OEM only. Refresh models 4355GE, 4355G, 4655GE, 4655G released November 11, 2022.)	8 (16)	3.6	4.4	8 MB	2 × 4	Radeon; Graphics (Note: All of the iGPUs are branded as AMD Radeon Graphics.)	2.1	512:32:16; 8 CU	2150.4	65 W	Jul 21, 2020	OEM
Ryzen 7	4700GE	8 (16)	3.1	4.3	8 MB	2 × 4	Radeon; Graphics	2.0	512:32:16; 8 CU	2048	35 W	Jul 21, 2020	OEM
Ryzen 5	4600G	6 (12)	3.7	4.2	8 MB	2 × 3	Radeon; Graphics	1.9	448:28:14; 7 CU	1702.4	65 W	Jul 21, 2020 (OEM); Apr 4, 2022 (retail)	US $154
Ryzen 5	4600GE	6 (12)	3.3	4.2	8 MB	2 × 3	Radeon; Graphics	1.9	448:28:14; 7 CU	1702.4	35 W	Jul 21, 2020	OEM
Ryzen 3	4300G	4 (8)	3.8	4.0	4 MB	1 × 4	Radeon; Graphics	1.7	384:24:12; 6 CU	1305.6	65 W	Jul 21, 2020	OEM
Ryzen 3	4300GE	4 (8)	3.5	4.0	4 MB	1 × 4	Radeon; Graphics	1.7	384:24:12; 6 CU	1305.6	35 W	Jul 21, 2020	OEM

=== Ryzen 5000 series ===
==== Vermeer (5000 series, Zen 3 based) ====
Common features of Ryzen 5000 desktop CPUs:

- Socket: AM4.
- All the CPUs support DDR4-3200 RAM in dual-channel mode in 2x1R and 2x2R configuration, but only DDR4-2933 for 4x1R and only DDR4-2667 for 4x2R.
- All the CPUs support 24 PCIe 4.0 lanes. 4 of the lanes are reserved as link to the chipset.
- No integrated graphics.
- L1 cache: 64 KB per core (32 KB data + 32 KB instruction).
- L2 cache: 512 KB per core.
- Fabrication process: TSMC 7FF.

Branding and model		Cores (threads)	Clock rate (GHz)		L3 cache (total)	TDP	Chiplets	Core config (Note: Core Complexes (CCX) × cores per CCX)	Thermal solution	Release date	MSRP
Branding and model		Cores (threads)	Base	Boost	L3 cache (total)	TDP	Chiplets	Core config	Thermal solution	Release date	MSRP
Ryzen 9	5950X	16 (32)	3.4	4.9	64 MB	105 W	2 × CCD; 1 × I/OD	2 × 8	—N/a	Nov 5, 2020	US $799
Ryzen 9	5900XT	16 (32)	3.3	4.8	64 MB	105 W	2 × CCD; 1 × I/OD	2 × 8	—N/a	Jul 31, 2024	US $349
Ryzen 9	5900X	12 (24)	3.7	4.8	64 MB	105 W	2 × CCD; 1 × I/OD	2 × 6	—N/a	Nov 5, 2020	US $549
Ryzen 9	5900	12 (24)	3.0	4.7	64 MB	65 W	2 × CCD; 1 × I/OD	2 × 6	—N/a	Jan 12, 2021	OEM
Ryzen 9	PRO 5945	12 (24)	3.0	4.7	64 MB	65 W	2 × CCD; 1 × I/OD	2 × 6	—N/a	Sep 2022	OEM
Ryzen 7	5800X3D (Note: A "10th Anniversary Edition" (referencing the launch date of Socket AM4) was launched on June 25, 2026, bundled together with a thermal pad.)	8 (16)	3.4	4.5	96 MB	105 W	1 × CCD; 1 × I/OD	1 × 8	—N/a	Apr 20, 2022; Jun 25, 2026 (10th ann. ed.)	US $449; US $349 (10th ann. ed.)
Ryzen 7	5800XT	8 (16)	3.8	4.8	32 MB	105 W	1 × CCD; 1 × I/OD	1 × 8	Wraith Prism, None (Note: On August 1, 2025, AMD downgraded or ceased including coolers on select models, as a result of its discontinuation of the Wraith Prism and Wraith Spire.)	Jul 31, 2024	US $249
Ryzen 7	5800X	8 (16)	3.8	4.7	32 MB	105 W	1 × CCD; 1 × I/OD	1 × 8	—N/a	Nov 5, 2020	US $449
Ryzen 7	5800	8 (16)	3.4	4.6	32 MB	65 W	1 × CCD; 1 × I/OD	1 × 8	—N/a	Jan 12, 2021	OEM
Ryzen 7	5700X3D	8 (16)	3.0	4.1	96 MB	105 W	1 × CCD; 1 × I/OD	1 × 8	—N/a	Jan 31, 2024	US $249
Ryzen 7	5700X	8 (16)	3.4	4.6	32 MB	65 W	1 × CCD; 1 × I/OD	1 × 8	—N/a	Apr 4, 2022	US $299
Ryzen 7	PRO 5845	8 (16)	3.4	4.6	32 MB	65 W	1 × CCD; 1 × I/OD	1 × 8	—N/a	Sep 2022	OEM
Ryzen 5	5600X3D	6 (12)	3.3	4.4	96 MB	105 W	1 × CCD; 1 × I/OD	1 × 6	—N/a	Jul 7, 2023	US $229; US Only
Ryzen 5	5600XT	6 (12)	3.7	4.7	32 MB	65 W	1 × CCD; 1 × I/OD	1 × 6	Wraith Stealth	Oct 31, 2024	US $194
Ryzen 5	5600X	6 (12)	3.7	4.6	32 MB	65 W	1 × CCD; 1 × I/OD	1 × 6	Wraith Stealth	Nov 5, 2020	US $299
Ryzen 5	5600T	6 (12)	3.5	4.5	32 MB	65 W	1 × CCD; 1 × I/OD	1 × 6	Wraith Stealth	Oct 31, 2024	US $186
Ryzen 5	5600	6 (12)	3.5	4.4	32 MB	65 W	1 × CCD; 1 × I/OD	1 × 6	Wraith Stealth	Apr 4, 2022	US $199
Ryzen 5	5600F	6 (12)	3.0	4.0	32 MB	65 W	1 × CCD; 1 × I/OD	1 × 6	Wraith Stealth	Sep 16, 2025	APJ Only
Ryzen 5	PRO 5645	6 (12)	3.7	4.6	32 MB	65 W	1 × CCD; 1 × I/OD	1 × 6	—N/a	Sep 2022	OEM
Ryzen 5	5500X3D	6 (12)	3.0	4.0	96 MB	105 W	1 × CCD; 1 × I/OD	1 × 6	—N/a	Jun 5, 2025	¥‌1099, LATAM, China and UK Only
Ryzen 5	5500F	6 (12)	3.0	4.4	16 MB	65 W	1 × CCD; 1 × I/OD	1 × 6	Wraith Stealth	Sep 10, 2026	US $99

==== Cezanne (5000 series, Zen 3 based) ====
Cézanne based CPUs that have the integrated GPU disabled. Common features of Ryzen 5000 (Cezanne) desktop CPUs:

- Socket: AM4.
- CPUs support DDR4-3200 in dual-channel mode.
- L1 cache: 64 KB (32 KB data + 32 KB instruction) per core.
- L2 cache: 512 KB per core.
- CPUs support 24 PCIe 3.0 lanes. 4 of the lanes are reserved as link to the chipset.
- No integrated graphics.
- Fabrication process: TSMC 7FF.

Branding and model		Cores (threads)	Thermal solution	Clock rate (GHz)		L3 cache (total)	TDP	Core config (Note: Core Complexes (CCX) × cores per CCX)	Release date	MSRP (USD)
Branding and model		Cores (threads)	Thermal solution	Base	Boost	L3 cache (total)	TDP	Core config	Release date	MSRP (USD)
Ryzen 7	5700	8 (16)	Wraith Stealth	3.7	4.6	16 MB	65 W	1 × 8	Apr 4, 2022 (OEM), Jan 31, 2024 (retail)	$175
Ryzen 5	5500	6 (12)	Wraith Stealth	3.6	4.2	16 MB	65 W	1 × 6	Apr 4, 2022	$159
Ryzen 3	5100	4 (8)	–	3.8	4.2	8 MB	65 W	1 × 4	2023	OEM

==== Cezanne (5000 series with Radeon Graphics, Zen 3/GCN5.1 based) ====
Common features of Ryzen 5000 desktop APUs:

- Socket: AM4.
- All the CPUs support DDR4-3200 in dual-channel mode.
- L1 cache: 64 KB (32 KB data + 32 KB instruction) per core.
- L2 cache: 512 KB per core.
- All the CPUs support 24 PCIe 3.0 lanes. 4 of the lanes are reserved as link to the chipset.
- Includes integrated GCN 5th generation GPU.
- Fabrication process: TSMC 7FF.

Branding and model		CPU					GPU (Note: All of the iGPUs are branded as AMD Radeon Graphics.)			Thermal solution	TDP	Release date	MSRP
Branding and model		Cores (threads)	Clock rate (GHz)		L3 cache (total)	Core config (Note: Core Complexes (CCX) × cores per CCX)	Clock (MHz)	Config (Note: Unified shaders : texture mapping units : render output units and compute units (CU))	Processing power (Note: Single precision performance is calculated from the base (or boost) core clock speed based on a FMA operation.) (GFLOPS)	Thermal solution	TDP	Release date	MSRP
Branding and model		Cores (threads)	Base	Boost	L3 cache (total)	Core config	Clock (MHz)	Config	Processing power (GFLOPS)	Thermal solution	TDP	Release date	MSRP
Ryzen 7	5705G	8 (16)	3.8	4.6	16 MB	1 × 8	2000	512:32:8; 8 CU	2048	—N/a	65 W		
Ryzen 7	5700G (Note: Model also available as PRO version as 5350GE, 5350G, 5650GE, 5650G, 5750GE, 5750G, released June 1, 2021. Refresh models 5355GE, 5355G, 5655GE, 5655G, 5755GE, 5755G released September 5, 2024.)	8 (16)	3.8	4.6	16 MB	1 × 8	2000	512:32:8; 8 CU	2048	Wraith Stealth	65 W	Apr 13, 2021 (OEM), Aug 5, 2021 (retail)	US $359
Ryzen 7	5705GE	8 (16)	3.2	4.6	16 MB	1 × 8	2000	512:32:8; 8 CU	2048	—N/a	35 W		
Ryzen 7	5700GE	8 (16)	3.2	4.6	16 MB	1 × 8	2000	512:32:8; 8 CU	2048	Wraith Stealth	35 W	Apr 13, 2021	OEM
Ryzen 5	5600GT	6 (12)	3.6	4.6	16 MB	1 × 6	1900	448:28:8; 7 CU	1702.4	Wraith Stealth	65 W	Jan 31, 2024	US $140
Ryzen 5	5605G	6 (12)	3.9	4.4	16 MB	1 × 6	1900	448:28:8; 7 CU	1702.4	—N/a	65 W		
Ryzen 5	5600G	6 (12)	3.9	4.4	16 MB	1 × 6	1900	448:28:8; 7 CU	1702.4	Wraith Stealth	65 W	Apr 13, 2021 (OEM), Aug 5, 2021 (retail)	US $259
Ryzen 5	5605GE	6 (12)	3.4	4.4	16 MB	1 × 6	1900	448:28:8; 7 CU	1702.4	—N/a	35 W		
Ryzen 5	5600GE	6 (12)	3.4	4.4	16 MB	1 × 6	1900	448:28:8; 7 CU	1702.4	Wraith Stealth	35 W	Apr 13, 2021	OEM
Ryzen 5	5500GT	6 (12)	3.6	4.4	16 MB	1 × 6	1900	448:28:8; 7 CU	1702.4	Wraith Stealth	65 W	Jan 08, 2024	US $125
Ryzen 3	5305G	4 (8)	4.0	4.2	8 MB	1 × 4	1700	384:24:8; 6 CU	1305.6	—N/a	65 W		
Ryzen 3	5300G	4 (8)	4.0	4.2	8 MB	1 × 4	1700	384:24:8; 6 CU	1305.6	OEM	65 W	Apr 13, 2021	OEM
Ryzen 3	5305GE	4 (8)	3.6	4.2	8 MB	1 × 4	1700	384:24:8; 6 CU	1305.6	—N/a	35 W		
Ryzen 3	5300GE	4 (8)	3.6	4.2	8 MB	1 × 4	1700	384:24:8; 6 CU	1305.6	OEM	35 W	Apr 13, 2021	OEM

==== Chagall (Threadripper 5000 series, Zen 3 based) ====
Common features of Ryzen 5000 workstation CPUs:

- Socket: sWRX8.
- All the CPUs support DDR4-3200 in octa-channel mode.
- L1 cache: 64 KB (32 KB data + 32 KB instruction) per core.
- L2 cache: 512 KB per core.
- All the CPUs support 128 PCIe 4.0 lanes. 8 of the lanes are reserved as link to the chipset.
- No integrated graphics.
- Fabrication process: TSMC 7FF.

Branding and Model		Cores (threads)	Clock rate (GHz)		L3 cache (total)	TDP	Chiplets	Core config (Note: Core Complexes (CCX) × cores per CCX)	Release date	MSRP
Branding and Model		Cores (threads)	Base	Boost	L3 cache (total)	TDP	Chiplets	Core config	Release date	MSRP
Ryzen Threadripper PRO	5995WX	64 (128)	2.7	4.5	256 MB	280 W	8 × CCD; 1 × I/OD	8 × 8	Mar 8, 2022 (OEM) / ? (retail)	OEM / US $6500
Ryzen Threadripper PRO	5975WX	32 (64)	3.6	4.5	128 MB	280 W	4 × CCD; 1 × I/OD	4 × 8	Mar 8, 2022 (OEM) / ? (retail)	OEM / US $3300
Ryzen Threadripper PRO	5965WX	24 (48)	3.8	4.5	128 MB	280 W	4 × CCD; 1 × I/OD	4 × 6	Mar 8, 2022 (OEM) / ? (retail)	OEM / US $2400
Ryzen Threadripper PRO	5955WX	16 (32)	4.0	4.5	64 MB	280 W	2 × CCD; 1 × I/OD	2 × 8	Mar 8, 2022	OEM
Ryzen Threadripper PRO	5945WX	12 (24)	4.1	4.5	64 MB	280 W	2 × CCD; 1 × I/OD	2 × 6	Mar 8, 2022	OEM

=== Ryzen 7000 series ===
==== Raphael (7000 series, Zen 4/RDNA2 based) ====
Common features of Ryzen 7000 desktop CPUs:

- Socket: AM5.
- All the CPUs support DDR5-5200 RAM in dual-channel mode in 2x1R and 2x2R configuration, but only DDR5-3600 for 4x1R and 4x2R.
- All the CPUs support 28 PCIe 5.0 lanes. 4 of the lanes are reserved as link to the chipset.
- Includes integrated RDNA 2 GPU on the I/O die with 2 CUs and clock speeds of 400 MHz (base), 2.2 GHz (boost). (Note: Self identifies as "AMD Radeon Graphics". See RDNA 2 § Integrated graphics processors (iGPs).) Models with "F" suffixes are without iGPUs.
- L1 cache: 64 KB (32 KB data + 32 KB instruction) per core.
- L2 cache: 1 MB per core.
- Fabrication process: TSMC N5 FinFET (N6 FinFET for the I/O die).

Branding and model		Cores (threads)	Clock rate (GHz)		L3 cache (total)	Chiplets	Core config (Note: Core Complexes (CCX) × cores per CCX)	TDP	Thermal solution	Release date	MSRP
Branding and model		Cores (threads)	Base	Boost	L3 cache (total)	Chiplets	Core config	TDP	Thermal solution	Release date	MSRP
Ryzen 9	7950X3D	16 (32)	4.2	5.7	128 MB (Note: Only one of the two CCXes has additional 64 MB 3D V-Cache. Only the CCX without 3D V-Cache will be able to reach the maximum boost clocks. The CCX with 3D V-Cache will clock lower.)	2 × CCD; 1 × I/OD	2 × 8	120 W	—N/a	Feb 28, 2023	US $699
Ryzen 9	7950X	16 (32)	4.5	5.7	64 MB	2 × CCD; 1 × I/OD	2 × 8	170 W	—N/a	Sep 27, 2022	US $699
Ryzen 9	7900X3D	12 (24)	4.4	5.6	128 MB	2 × CCD; 1 × I/OD	2 × 6	120 W	—N/a	Feb 28, 2023	US $599
Ryzen 9	7900X	12 (24)	4.7	5.6	64 MB	2 × CCD; 1 × I/OD	2 × 6	170 W	—N/a	Sep 27, 2022	US $549
Ryzen 9	7900	12 (24)	3.7	5.4	64 MB	2 × CCD; 1 × I/OD	2 × 6	65 W	Wraith Prism, None (Note: On August 1, 2025, AMD downgraded or ceased including coolers on select models, as a result of its discontinuation of the Wraith Prism and Wraith Spire.)	Jan 10, 2023	US $429
Ryzen 9	PRO 7945	12 (24)	3.7	5.4	64 MB	2 × CCD; 1 × I/OD	2 × 6	65 W	Wraith Spire, Wraith Stealth	Jun 13, 2023	OEM
Ryzen 7	7800X3D	8 (16)	4.2	5.0	96 MB	1 × CCD; 1 × I/OD	1 × 8	120 W	—N/a	Apr 6, 2023	US $449
Ryzen 7	7700X3D	8 (16)	4.0	4.5	96 MB	1 × CCD; 1 × I/OD	1 × 8	120 W	—N/a	Jul 16, 2026	US $329
Ryzen 7	7700X	8 (16)	4.5	5.4	32 MB	1 × CCD; 1 × I/OD	1 × 8	105 W	—N/a	Sep 27, 2022	US $399
Ryzen 7	7700	8 (16)	3.8	5.3	32 MB	1 × CCD; 1 × I/OD	1 × 8	65 W	Wraith Prism, None	Jan 10, 2023	US $329
Ryzen 7	PRO 7745	8 (16)	3.8	5.3	32 MB	1 × CCD; 1 × I/OD	1 × 8	65 W	Wraith Spire, Wraith Stealth	Jun 13, 2023	OEM
Ryzen 5	7600X3D	6 (12)	4.1	4.7	96 MB	1 × CCD; 1 × I/OD	1 × 6	65 W	—N/a	Aug 31, 2024 (Note: Release date for US, where it is only sold though MicroCenter. In Europe it is only available in Germany, and only through MindFactory, which released it on September 5, 2024.)	US $299
Ryzen 5	7600X	6 (12)	4.7	5.3	32 MB	1 × CCD; 1 × I/OD	1 × 6	105 W	—N/a	Sep 27, 2022	US $299
Ryzen 5	7600	6 (12)	3.8	5.1	32 MB	1 × CCD; 1 × I/OD	1 × 6	65 W	Wraith Stealth	Jan 10, 2023	US $229
Ryzen 5	PRO 7645	6 (12)	3.8	5.1	32 MB	1 × CCD; 1 × I/OD	1 × 6	65 W	Wraith Spire, Wraith Stealth	Jun 13, 2023	OEM
Ryzen 5	7500X3D	6 (12)	4.0	4.5	96 MB	1 × CCD; 1 × I/OD	1 × 6	65 W	—N/a	Nov 12, 2025	OEM
Ryzen 5	7500	6 (12)	3.7	5.0	32 MB	1 × CCD; 1 × I/OD	1 × 6	65 W	Wraith Stealth	Sep 10, 2026	US $189
Ryzen 5	7500F	6 (12)	3.7	5.0	32 MB	1 × CCD; 1 × I/OD	1 × 6	65 W	Wraith Stealth	Jul 22, 2023	US $179
Ryzen 5	7400F (Note: The 7400F uses thermal paste between the silicon and the integrated heat spreader, whereas all other 7000 series models use soldered thermal interface material instead.)	6 (12)	3.7	4.7	32 MB	1 × CCD; 1 × I/OD	1 × 6	65 W	Wraith Stealth	Jan 9, 2025	CNY 849 (Mainland China); APJ Only
Ryzen 5	7400 (Note: Model also available as PRO version as PRO 7445.)	6 (12)	3.3	4.3	16 MB	1 × CCD; 1 × I/OD	1 × 6	65 W	Wraith Stealth	Sep 16, 2025	TBA

==== Storm Peak (Threadripper 7000 series, Zen 4 based) ====
Common features of Ryzen 7000 HEDT/workstation CPUs:

- Socket: sTR5.
- Threadripper CPUs support DDR5-5200 in quad-channel mode while Threadripper PRO CPUs support DDR5-5200 in octa-channel mode with ECC support.
- L1 cache: 64 KB (32 KB data + 32 KB instruction) per core.
- L2 cache: 1 MB per core.
- Threadripper CPUs support 48 PCIe 5.0 and 24 PCIe 4.0 lanes while Threadripper PRO CPUs support 128 PCIe 5.0 lanes. In addition, all processor models have 4 PCIe 4.0 lanes reserved as link to the chipset.
- No integrated graphics.
- Fabrication process: TSMC 5FF.

Branding and model		Cores (threads)	Clock rate (GHz)		L3 cache (total)	TDP	Chiplets	Core config (Note: Core Complexes (CCXs) × cores per CCX)	Release date	MSRP
Branding and model		Cores (threads)	Base	Boost	L3 cache (total)	TDP	Chiplets	Core config	Release date	MSRP
Ryzen Threadripper PRO	7995WX	96 (192)	2.5	5.1	384 MB	350 W	12 × CCD; 1 × I/OD	12 × 8	Nov 21, 2023	US $9999
Ryzen Threadripper PRO	7985WX	64 (128)	3.2	5.1	256 MB	350 W	8 × CCD; 1 × I/OD	8 × 8	Nov 21, 2023	US $7349
Ryzen Threadripper PRO	7975WX	32 (64)	4.0	5.3	128 MB	350 W	4 × CCD; 1 × I/OD	4 × 8	Nov 21, 2023	US $3899
Ryzen Threadripper PRO	7965WX	24 (48)	4.2	5.3	128 MB	350 W	4 × CCD; 1 × I/OD	4 × 6	Nov 21, 2023	US $2649
Ryzen Threadripper PRO	7955WX	16 (32)	4.5	5.3	64 MB	350 W	2 × CCD; 1 × I/OD	2 × 8	Nov 21, 2023	US $1899
Ryzen Threadripper PRO	7945WX	12 (24)	4.7	5.3	64 MB	350 W	2 × CCD; 1 × I/OD	2 × 6	Nov 21, 2023	US $1399
Ryzen Threadripper	7980X	64 (128)	3.2	5.1	256 MB	350 W	8 × CCD; 1 × I/OD	8 × 8	Nov 21, 2023	US $4999
Ryzen Threadripper	7970X	32 (64)	4.0	5.3	128 MB	350 W	4 × CCD; 1 × I/OD	4 × 8	Nov 21, 2023	US $2499
Ryzen Threadripper	7960X	24 (48)	4.2	5.3	128 MB	350 W	4 × CCD; 1 × I/OD	4 × 6	Nov 21, 2023	US $1499

=== Ryzen 8000 series ===
==== Phoenix (8000 series, Zen 4 based) ====
Common features of Ryzen 8000 desktop CPUs:

- Socket: AM5.
- All the CPUs support DDR5-5200 RAM in dual-channel mode in 2x1R and 2x2R configuration, but only DDR5-3600 for 4x1R and 4x2R.
- L1 cache: 64 KB (32 KB data + 32 KB instruction) per core.
- L2 cache: 1 MB per core.
- All the CPUs support 20 PCIe 4.0 lanes. 4 of the lanes are reserved as link to the chipset.
- No integrated graphics.
- Fabrication process: TSMC 4 nm FinFET.

Branding and model		Cores (threads)	Clock rate (GHz)		L3 cache (total)	NPU	TDP	Core config (Note: Core Complexes (CCX) × cores per CCX.)	Thermal solution	Release date	MSRP
Branding and model		Cores (threads)	Base	Boost	L3 cache (total)	NPU	TDP	Core config	Thermal solution	Release date	MSRP
Ryzen 7	8700F	8 (16)	4.1	5.0	16 MB	Yes	65 W	1 × 8	Wraith Stealth	April 1, 2024	OEM
Ryzen 5	8400F	6 (12)	4.2	4.7	16 MB	No	65 W	1 × 6	Wraith Stealth	April 1, 2024	OEM

==== Phoenix (8000 series with Radeon Graphics, Zen 4/RDNA3/XDNA based) ====
Common features of Ryzen 8000G desktop APUs:

- Socket: AM5.
- All the CPUs support DDR5-5200 RAM in dual-channel mode in 2x1R and 2x2R configuration, but only DDR5-3600 for 4x1R and 4x2R.
- L1 cache: 64 KB (32 KB data + 32 KB instruction) per core.
- L2 cache: 1 MB per core.
- Models with Zen 4c cores (codenamed Phoenix 2) support 14 PCIe 4.0 lanes, while models without them support 20 lanes. 4 of the lanes are reserved as link to the chipset.
- Includes integrated RDNA 3 GPU.
- Includes XDNA AI Engine (Ryzen AI) on models without Zen 4c cores.
- Fabrication process: TSMC 4 nm FinFET.

Branding and model		CPU							GPU			NPU	TDP	Thermal solution	Release date	MSRP
Branding and model		Cores (threads)			Clock rate (GHz)		L3 cache (total)	Core config (Note: Core Complexes (CCX) × cores per CCX, or Zen 4 + Zen 4c cores)	Model	Core config (Note: Unified shaders : Texture mapping units : Render output units : Ray accelerators : AI accelerators and Compute units (CU)) (Note: GPUs based on RDNA 3 have dual-issue stream processors so that up to two shader instructions can be executed per clock cycle under certain parallelism conditions.)	Clock (GHz)	NPU	TDP	Thermal solution	Release date	MSRP
Branding and model		Total	Zen 4	Zen 4c	Base	Boost	L3 cache (total)	Core config	Model	Core config	Clock (GHz)	NPU	TDP	Thermal solution	Release date	MSRP
Ryzen 7	8700G (Note: Model also available as PRO version as 8300G, 8300GE, 8500G, 8500GE, 8600G, 8700G.)	8 (16)	8 (16)	—N/a	4.2	5.1	16 MB	1 × 8	780M	12 CUs; 768:48:24:12	2.9	Ryzen AI; Up to 16 TOPS	65 W	Wraith Spire (before Aug 1, 2025); Wraith Stealth (since Aug 1, 2025)	Jan 31, 2024	US $329
Ryzen 7	PRO 8700GE	8 (16)	8 (16)	—N/a	3.6	5.1	16 MB	1 × 8	780M	12 CUs; 768:48:24:12	2.7	Ryzen AI; Up to 16 TOPS	35 W	—N/a	Apr 16, 2024	US $299
Ryzen 5	8600G	6 (12)	6 (12)	—N/a	4.3	5.0	16 MB	1 × 6	760M	8 CUs; 512:32:16:8	2.8	Ryzen AI; Up to 16 TOPS	65 W	Wraith Stealth	Jan 31, 2024	US $229
Ryzen 5	PRO 8600GE	6 (12)	6 (12)	—N/a	3.9	5.0	16 MB	1 × 6	760M	8 CUs; 512:32:16:8	2.6	Ryzen AI; Up to 16 TOPS	35 W	—N/a	Apr 16, 2024	OEM
Ryzen 5	8500G	6 (12)	2 (4)	4 (8)	4.1 / 3.2 (Note: Zen 4 cores' base frequency / Zen 4c cores' base frequency)	5.0 / 3.7 (Note: Zen 4 cores' boost frequency / Zen 4c cores' boost frequency)	16 MB	2 + 4	740M	4 CUs; 256:16:8:4	2.8	No	65 W	Wraith Stealth	Jan 31, 2024	US $179
Ryzen 5	8500GE	6 (12)	2 (4)	4 (8)	3.9 / 3.1	5.0 / 3.7	16 MB	2 + 4	740M	4 CUs; 256:16:8:4	2.8	No	35 W	—N/a	Apr 16, 2024	OEM
Ryzen 3	8300G	4 (8)	1 (2)	3 (6)	4.0 / 3.2	4.9 / 3.6	8 MB	1 + 3	740M	4 CUs; 256:16:8:4	2.6	No	65 W	Wraith Stealth	Jan 2024 (OEM) / Q1 2024 (retail)	OEM / TBA
Ryzen 3	8300GE	4 (8)	1 (2)	3 (6)	4.0 / 3.2	4.9 / 3.6	8 MB	1 + 3	740M	4 CUs; 256:16:8:4	2.6	No	35 W	—N/a	Apr 16, 2024	OEM

=== Ryzen 9000 series ===
==== Granite Ridge (9000 series, Zen 5/RDNA2 based) ====
Common features of Ryzen 9000 desktop CPUs:

- Socket: AM5.
- All the CPUs support DDR5-5600 RAM in dual-channel mode in 2x1R and 2x2R configuration, but only DDR5-3600 for 4x1R and 4x2R.
- All the CPUs support 28 PCIe 5.0 lanes. 4 of the lanes are reserved as link to the chipset.
- Includes integrated RDNA 2 GPU with 2 CUs and base and boost clock speeds of 0.4 GHz and 2.2 GHz, respectively. Models with "F" suffixes are without iGPUs.
- L1 cache: 80 KB (48 KB data + 32 KB instruction) per core.
- L2 cache: 1 MB per core.
- Models with an "X3D" suffix include 2nd-generation 3D V-Cache in the form of a 64 MB cache die, which augments the L3 cache of one CCD.
- Models with an "X3D2" suffix or branded as "Dual Edition" include 2nd-generation 3D V-Cache in the form of two 64 MB cache dies (totaling to 128 MB), one die per CCD, which augment the L3 cache of their respective CCD.
- Fabrication process: TSMC N4X FinFET (N6 FinFET for the I/O die).

Branding and Model		Cores (threads)	Clock rate (GHz)		L3 cache (total)	TDP	Chiplets	Core config (Note: Core Complexes (CCX) × cores per CCX)	Thermal solution	Release date	Launch MSRP
Branding and Model		Cores (threads)	Base	Boost	L3 cache (total)	TDP	Chiplets	Core config	Thermal solution	Release date	Launch MSRP
Ryzen 9	9950X3D2 Dual Edition	16 (32)	4.3	5.6	192 MB (Note: Both CCXes have a 3D V-Cache.)	200 W	2 × CCD; 1 × I/OD	2 × 8	—N/a	April 22, 2026	US $899
Ryzen 9	9950X3D	16 (32)	4.3	5.7	128 MB (Note: Only one of the two CCXes has 3D V-Cache.)	170 W	2 × CCD; 1 × I/OD	2 × 8	—N/a	March 12, 2025	US $699
Ryzen 9	PRO 9965X3D	16 (32)	4.3	5.5	128 MB	170 W	2 × CCD; 1 × I/OD	2 × 8	—N/a	June 30, 2026	OEM
Ryzen 9	PRO 9965	16 (32)	4.3	5.5	64 MB	170 W	2 × CCD; 1 × I/OD	2 × 8	—N/a	June 30, 2026	OEM
Ryzen 9	9950X	16 (32)	4.3	5.7	64 MB	170 W	2 × CCD; 1 × I/OD	2 × 8	—N/a	August 15, 2024	US $649
Ryzen 9	PRO 9955	12 (24)	3.4	5.4	64 MB	120 W	2 × CCD; 1 × I/OD	2 × 6	—N/a	June 30, 2026	OEM
Ryzen 9	PRO 9945	12 (24)	3.4	5.4	64 MB	65 W	2 × CCD; 1 × I/OD	2 × 6	Wraith; Stealth	September 16, 2025	OEM
Ryzen 9	9900X3D	12 (24)	4.4	5.5	128 MB	120 W	2 × CCD; 1 × I/OD	2 × 6	—N/a	March 12, 2025	US $599
Ryzen 9	9900X	12 (24)	4.4	5.6	64 MB	120 W	2 × CCD; 1 × I/OD	2 × 6	—N/a	August 15, 2024	US $499
Ryzen 7	9850X3D	8 (16)	4.7	5.6	96 MB	120 W	1 × CCD; 1 × I/OD	1 × 8	—N/a	January 29, 2026	US $499
Ryzen 7	9800X3D (Note: Model also available as PRO version as PRO 9755X3D.)	8 (16)	4.7	5.2	96 MB	120 W	1 × CCD; 1 × I/OD	1 × 8	—N/a	November 7, 2024	US $479
Ryzen 7	PRO 9755	8 (16)	3.8	5.4	32 MB	120 W	1 × CCD; 1 × I/OD	1 × 8	—N/a	June 30, 2026	OEM
Ryzen 7	PRO 9745	8 (16)	3.8	5.4	32 MB	65 W	1 × CCD; 1 × I/OD	1 × 8	Wraith; Stealth	September 16, 2025	OEM
Ryzen 7	9700X	8 (16)	3.8	5.5	32 MB	65 W (Note: TDP configurable to 105 W)	1 × CCD; 1 × I/OD	1 × 8	—N/a	August 8, 2024	US $359
Ryzen 7	9700F	8 (16)	3.8	5.5	32 MB	65 W	1 × CCD; 1 × I/OD	1 × 8	—N/a	September 16, 2025	TBA
Ryzen 5	PRO 9655	6 (12)	3.9	5.4	32 MB	120 W	1 × CCD; 1 × I/OD	1 × 6	—N/a	June 30, 2026	OEM
Ryzen 5	9600X (Note: Model also available as PRO version as PRO 9645.)	6 (12)	3.9	5.4	32 MB	65 W	1 × CCD; 1 × I/OD	1 × 6	—N/a	August 8, 2024	US $279
Ryzen 5	9600	6 (12)	3.8	5.2	32 MB	65 W	1 × CCD; 1 × I/OD	1 × 6	Wraith; Stealth	February 19, 2025	TBA
Ryzen 5	9500F	6 (12)	3.8	5.0	32 MB	65 W	1 × CCD; 1 × I/OD	1 × 6	Wraith; Stealth	September 16, 2025	CN ¥1,299

==== Shimada Peak (Threadripper 9000 series, Zen 5 based) ====
Common features of Ryzen 9000 HEDT/workstation CPUs:

- Socket: sTR5.
- Threadripper CPUs support DDR5-6400 in quad-channel mode while Threadripper PRO CPUs support DDR5-6400 in octa-channel mode with ECC support.
- L1 cache: 80 KB (48 KB data + 32 KB instruction) per core.
- L2 cache: 1 MB per core.
- Threadripper CPUs support 80 PCIe 5.0 lanes (4 of which runs PCIe 4.0 mode to the chipset; and remaining are usually running as 48 PCIe 5.0 lanes plus 24 PCIe 4.0 lanes), while Threadripper PRO CPUs support 128 PCIe 5.0 lanes (4 of which runs in PCIe 4.0 mode to the chipset), and extra 8 PCIe 3.0 lanes. Some lanes support alternative mode of running SATA3.
- No integrated graphics.
- Fabrication process: TSMC 4FFX.

Branding and model		Cores (threads)	Clock rate (GHz)		L3 cache (total)	TDP	Chiplets	Core config (Note: Core Complexes (CCXs) × cores per CCX)	Release date	MSRP
Branding and model		Cores (threads)	Base	Boost	L3 cache (total)	TDP	Chiplets	Core config	Release date	MSRP
Ryzen Threadripper PRO	9995WX	96 (192)	2.5	5.4	384 MB	350 W	12 × CCD; 1 × I/OD	12 × 8	July 2025	$11,699
Ryzen Threadripper PRO	9985WX	64 (128)	3.2	5.4	256 MB	350 W	8 × CCD; 1 × I/OD	8 × 8	July 2025	$7,999
Ryzen Threadripper PRO	9975WX	32 (64)	4.0	5.4	128 MB	350 W	4 × CCD; 1 × I/OD	4 × 8	July 2025	$4,099
Ryzen Threadripper PRO	9965WX	24 (48)	4.2	5.4	128 MB	350 W	4 × CCD; 1 × I/OD	4 × 6	July 2025	$2,899
Ryzen Threadripper PRO	9955WX	16 (32)	4.5	5.4	64 MB	350 W	2 × CCD; 1 × I/OD	2 × 8	July 2025	$1,649
Ryzen Threadripper PRO	9945WX	12 (24)	4.7	5.4	64 MB	350 W	2 × CCD; 1 × I/OD	2 × 6	July 2025	OEM
Ryzen Threadripper	9980X	64 (128)	3.2	5.4	256 MB	350 W	8 × CCD; 1 × I/OD	8 × 8	July 2025	$4,999
Ryzen Threadripper	9970X	32 (64)	4.0	5.4	128 MB	350 W	4 × CCD; 1 × I/OD	4 × 8	July 2025	$2,499
Ryzen Threadripper	9960X	24 (48)	4.2	5.4	128 MB	350 W	4 × CCD; 1 × I/OD	4 × 6	July 2025	$1,499

=== Ryzen AI 400 series ===
==== Gorgon Point AM5 (AI 400 Series, Zen 5/RDNA3.5/XDNA2 based) ====
Common features of Ryzen AI 400 desktop APUs:

- Socket: AM5.
- All the CPUs support DDR5-5600 RAM in dual-channel mode in 2x1R and 2x2R configuration, but only DDR5-3600 for 4x1R and 4x2R.
- L1 cache: 80 KB per core.
- L2 cache: 1 MB per core.
- Includes integrated RDNA 3.5 GPU.
- Includes XDNA 2 AI Engine (Ryzen AI).
- Fabrication process: TSMC N4P FinFET.

Branding and model		CPU				GPU			NPU (Ryzen AI)	TDP	Release	MSRP
Branding and model		Cores (threads)	Clock rate (GHz)		L3 cache	GPU			NPU (Ryzen AI)	TDP	Release	MSRP
Branding and model		Cores (threads)	Base	Boost	L3 cache	Model	CUs	Clock (GHz)	NPU (Ryzen AI)	TDP	Release	MSRP
Ryzen AI 7	(PRO) 450G	8 (16)	2.0	5.1	16 MB	Radeon 860M	8	3.1	Up to 50 TOPS	65 W	March 2, 2026 (OEM)	OEM
Ryzen AI 7	(PRO) 450GE	8 (16)	2.0	5.1	16 MB	Radeon 860M	8	3.1	Up to 50 TOPS	35 W	March 2, 2026 (OEM)	OEM
Ryzen AI 5	(PRO) 440G	6 (12)	2.0	4.8	16 MB	Radeon 840M	4	2.9	Up to 50 TOPS	65 W	March 2, 2026 (OEM)	OEM
Ryzen AI 5	(PRO) 440GE	6 (12)	2.0	4.8	16 MB	Radeon 840M	4	2.9	Up to 50 TOPS	35 W	March 2, 2026 (OEM)	OEM
Ryzen AI 5	(PRO) 435G	6 (12)	2.0	4.5	8 MB	Radeon 840M	4	2.8	Up to 50 TOPS	65 W	March 2, 2026 (OEM)	OEM
Ryzen AI 5	(PRO) 435GE	6 (12)	2.0	4.5	8 MB	Radeon 840M	4	2.8	Up to 50 TOPS	35 W	March 2, 2026 (OEM)	OEM

== Mobile processors ==
=== Ryzen 2000 series ===
==== Raven Ridge (Zen/GCN5 based) ====
Common features of Ryzen 2000 notebook APUs:

- Socket: FP5.
- The U-series CPUs support DDR4-2400 in dual-channel mode, while the H-series CPUs support it at DDR4-3200 speeds.
- L1 cache: 96 KB (32 KB data + 64 KB instruction) per core.
- L2 cache: 512 KB per core.
- All the CPUs support 12 PCIe 3.0 lanes.
- Includes integrated GCN 5th generation GPU.
- Fabrication process: GlobalFoundries 14LP.

Branding and Model		CPU					GPU				TDP	Release date
Branding and Model		Cores (threads)	Clock rate (GHz)		L3 cache (total)	Core config (Note: Core Complexes (CCX) × cores per CCX)	Model (Note: Branded as Radeon Vega instead of Radeon RX Vega on the PRO CPUs.)	Clock (GHz)	Config (Note: Unified shaders : Texture mapping units : Render output units and Compute units (CU))	Processing power (GFLOPS) (Note: Single precision performance is calculated from the base (or boost) core clock speed based on a FMA operation.)	TDP	Release date
Branding and Model		Cores (threads)	Base	Boost	L3 cache (total)	Core config	Model	Clock (GHz)	Config	Processing power (GFLOPS)	TDP	Release date
Ryzen 7	2800H	4 (8)	3.3	3.8	4 MB	1 × 4	RX Vega 11	1.3	704:44:16; 11 CUs	1830.4	35–54 W	Sep 10, 2018
Ryzen 7	2700U (Note: Model also available as PRO version as 2300U, 2500U, 2700U, released on May 15, 2018.)	4 (8)	2.2	3.8	4 MB	1 × 4	RX Vega 10	1.3	640:40:16; 10 CUs	1664	12–25 W	Oct 26, 2017
Ryzen 5	2600H	4 (8)	3.2	3.6	4 MB	1 × 4	Vega 8	1.1	512:32:16; 8 CUs	1126.4	35–54 W	Sep 10, 2018
Ryzen 5	2500U	4 (8)	2.0	3.6	4 MB	1 × 4	Vega 8	1.1	512:32:16; 8 CUs	1126.4	12–25 W	Oct 26, 2017
Ryzen 3	2300U	4 (4)	2.0	3.4	4 MB	1 × 4	Vega 6	1.1	384:24:8; 6 CUs	844.8	12–25 W	Jan 8, 2018
Ryzen 3	2200U	2 (4)	2.5	3.4	4 MB	1 × 2	Vega 3	1.1	192:12:4; 3 CUs	422.4	12–25 W	Jan 8, 2018

=== Ryzen 3000 series ===
==== Dalí (Zen/GCN5 based) ====
Common features of Ryzen 3000 notebook APUs:

- Socket: FP5.
- All the CPUs support DDR4-2400 in dual-channel mode.
- L1 cache: 96 KB (32 KB data + 64 KB instruction) per core.
- L2 cache: 512 KB per core.
- All these CPUs provide 12 PCIe 3.0 lanes. 4 are reserved as link to the chipset.
- Includes integrated GCN 5th generation GPU.
- Fabrication process: GlobalFoundries 14LP.

Branding and Model		CPU					GPU				TDP	Release date
Branding and Model		Cores (threads)	Clock rate (GHz)		L3 cache (total)	Core config (Note: Core Complexes (CCX) × cores per CCX)	Model	Clock (GHz)	Config (Note: Unified Shaders : Texture Mapping Units : Render Output Units and Compute Units (CU))	Processing power (GFLOPS) (Note: Single precision performance is calculated from the base (or boost) core clock speed based on a FMA operation.)	TDP	Release date
Branding and Model		Cores (threads)	Base	Boost	L3 cache (total)	Core config	Model	Clock (GHz)	Config	Processing power (GFLOPS)	TDP	Release date
Ryzen 3	3250U	2 (4)	2.6	3.5	4 MB	1 × 2	Vega 3	1.2	192:12:4; 3 CUs	460.8	12–25 W	Jan 6, 2020
Ryzen 3	3250C	2 (4)	2.6	3.5	4 MB	1 × 2	Vega 3	1.2	192:12:4; 3 CUs	460.8	12–25 W	Sep 22, 2020
Ryzen 3	3200U	2 (4)	2.6	3.5	4 MB	1 × 2	Vega 3	1.2	192:12:4; 3 CUs	460.8	12–25 W	Jan 6, 2019

==== Picasso (Zen+/GCN5 based) ====
Common features of Ryzen 3000 notebook APUs:

- Socket: FP5.
- All the CPUs support DDR4-2400 in dual-channel mode.
- L1 cache: 96 KB (32 KB data + 64 KB instruction) per core.
- L2 cache: 512 KB per core.
- All the CPUs support 16 PCIe 3.0 lanes.
- Includes integrated GCN 5th generation GPU.
- Fabrication process: GlobalFoundries 12LP (14LP+).

Branding and Model		CPU					GPU				TDP	Release date
Branding and Model		Cores (threads)	Clock rate (GHz)		L3 cache (total)	Core config (Note: Core Complexes (CCX) × cores per CCX)	Model	Clock (GHz)	Config (Note: Unified Shaders : Texture Mapping Units : Render Output Units and Compute Units (CU))	Processing power (GFLOPS) (Note: Single precision performance is calculated from the base (or boost) core clock speed based on a FMA operation.)	TDP	Release date
Branding and Model		Cores (threads)	Base	Boost	L3 cache (total)	Core config	Model	Clock (GHz)	Config	Processing power (GFLOPS)	TDP	Release date
Ryzen 7	3780U	4 (8)	2.3	4.0	4 MB	1 × 4	RX Vega 11	1.4	704:44:16; 11 CU	1971.2	15 W	Oct 2019
Ryzen 7	3750H	4 (8)	2.3	4.0	4 MB	1 × 4	RX Vega 10	1.4	640:40:16; 10 CU	1792.0	35 W	Jan 6, 2019
Ryzen 7	3700C	4 (8)	2.3	4.0	4 MB	1 × 4	RX Vega 10	1.4	640:40:16; 10 CU	1792.0	15 W	Sep 22, 2020
Ryzen 7	3700U (Note: Model also available as PRO version, released April 8, 2019.)	4 (8)	2.3	4.0	4 MB	1 × 4	RX Vega 10	1.4	640:40:16; 10 CU	1792.0	15 W	Jan 6, 2019
Ryzen 5	3580U	4 (8)	2.1	3.7	4 MB	1 × 4	Vega 9	1.3	576:36:16; 9 CU	1497.6	15 W	Oct 2019
Ryzen 5	3550H	4 (8)	2.1	3.7	4 MB	1 × 4	Vega 8	1.2	512:32:8; 8 CU	1228.8	35 W	Jan 6, 2019
Ryzen 5	3500C	4 (8)	2.1	3.7	4 MB	1 × 4	Vega 8	1.2	512:32:8; 8 CU	1228.8	15 W	Sep 22, 2020
Ryzen 5	3500U	4 (8)	2.1	3.7	4 MB	1 × 4	Vega 8	1.2	512:32:8; 8 CU	1228.8	15 W	Jan 6, 2019
Ryzen 5	3450U	4 (8)	2.1	3.5	4 MB	1 × 4	Vega 8	1.2	512:32:8; 8 CU	1228.8	15 W	Jun 2020
Ryzen 3	3350U	4 (4)	2.1	3.5	4 MB	1 × 4	Vega 6	1.2	384:24:8; 6 CU	921.6	15 W	Jan 6, 2019
Ryzen 3	3300U	4 (4)	2.1	3.5	4 MB	1 × 4	Vega 6	1.2	384:24:8; 6 CU	921.6	15 W	Jan 6, 2019

=== Ryzen 4000 series ===
==== Renoir (Zen 2/GCN5 based) ====
Common features of Ryzen 4000 notebook APUs:

- Socket: FP6.
- All the CPUs support DDR4-3200 or LPDDR4-4266 in dual-channel mode.
- L1 cache: 64 KB (32 KB data + 32 KB instruction) per core.
- L2 cache: 512 KB per core.
- All the CPUs support 16 PCIe 3.0 lanes.
- Includes integrated GCN 5th generation GPU.
- Fabrication process: TSMC 7FF.

Branding and Model		CPU					GPU				TDP	Release date
Branding and Model		Cores (threads)	Clock rate (GHz)		L3 cache (total)	Core config (Note: Core Complexes (CCX) × cores per CCX)	Model	Clock (GHz)	Config (Note: Unified shaders : texture mapping units : render output units and compute units (CU))	Processing power (GFLOPS) (Note: Single precision performance is calculated from the base (or boost) core clock speed based on a FMA operation.)	TDP	Release date
Branding and Model		Cores (threads)	Base	Boost	L3 cache (total)	Core config	Model	Clock (GHz)	Config	Processing power (GFLOPS)	TDP	Release date
Ryzen 9	4900H	8 (16)	3.3	4.4	8 MB	2 × 4	Radeon; Graphics (Note: All of the iGPUs are branded as AMD Radeon Graphics.)	1.75	512:32:8; 8 CU	1792	35–54 W	Mar 16, 2020
Ryzen 9	4900HS	8 (16)	3.0	4.3	8 MB	2 × 4	Radeon; Graphics	1.75	512:32:8; 8 CU	1792	35 W	Mar 16, 2020
Ryzen 7	4800H	8 (16)	2.9	4.2	8 MB	2 × 4	Radeon; Graphics	1.6	448:28:8; 7 CU	1433.6	35–54 W	Mar 16, 2020
Ryzen 7	4800HS	8 (16)	2.9	4.2	8 MB	2 × 4	Radeon; Graphics	1.6	448:28:8; 7 CU	1433.6	35 W	Mar 16, 2020
Ryzen 7	4980U (Note: Only found on the Microsoft Surface Laptop 4.)	8 (16)	2.0	4.4	8 MB	2 × 4	Radeon; Graphics	1.95	512:32:8; 8 CU	1996.8	10–25 W	Apr 13, 2021
Ryzen 7	4800U	8 (16)	1.8	4.2	8 MB	2 × 4	Radeon; Graphics	1.75	512:32:8; 8 CU	1792	10–25 W	Mar 16, 2020
Ryzen 7	4700U (Note: Model also available as PRO version as 4450U, 4650U, 4750U, released May 7, 2020.)	8 (8)	2.0	4.1	8 MB	2 × 4	Radeon; Graphics	1.6	448:28:8; 7 CU	1433.6	10–25 W	Mar 16, 2020
Ryzen 5	4600H	6 (12)	3.0	4.0	8 MB	2 × 3	Radeon; Graphics	1.5	384:24:8; 6 CU	1152	35–54 W	Mar 16, 2020
Ryzen 5	4600HS	6 (12)	3.0	4.0	8 MB	2 × 3	Radeon; Graphics	1.5	384:24:8; 6 CU	1152	35 W	Mar 16, 2020
Ryzen 5	4680U	6 (12)	2.1	4.0	8 MB	2 × 3	Radeon; Graphics	1.5	448:28:8; 7 CU	1344	10–25 W	Apr 13, 2021
Ryzen 5	4600U	6 (12)	2.1	4.0	8 MB	2 × 3	Radeon; Graphics	1.5	384:24:8; 6 CU	1152	10–25 W	Mar 16, 2020
Ryzen 5	4500U	6 (6)	2.3	4.0	8 MB	2 × 3	Radeon; Graphics	1.5	384:24:8; 6 CU	1152	10–25 W	Mar 16, 2020
Ryzen 3	4300U	4 (4)	2.7	3.7	4 MB	1 × 4	Radeon; Graphics	1.4	320:20:8; 5 CU	896	10–25 W	Mar 16, 2020

=== Ryzen 5000 series ===
==== Lucienne (Zen 2/GCN5 based) ====
Common features of Ryzen 5000 notebook APUs:

- Socket: FP6.
- All the CPUs support DDR4-3200 or LPDDR4-4266 in dual-channel mode.
- L1 cache: 64 KB (32 KB data + 32 KB instruction) per core.
- L2 cache: 512 KB per core.
- All the CPUs support 16 PCIe 3.0 lanes.
- Includes integrated GCN 5th generation GPU.
- Fabrication process: TSMC 7FF.

Branding and Model		CPU					GPU				TDP	Release date
Branding and Model		Cores (threads)	Clock rate (GHz)		L3 cache (total)	Core config (Note: Core Complexes (CCX) × cores per CCX)	Model	Clock (GHz)	Config (Note: Unified shaders : texture mapping units : render output units and compute units (CU))	Processing power (GFLOPS) (Note: Single precision performance is calculated from the base (or boost) core clock speed based on a FMA operation.)	TDP	Release date
Branding and Model		Cores (threads)	Base	Boost	L3 cache (total)	Core config	Model	Clock (GHz)	Config	Processing power (GFLOPS)	TDP	Release date
Ryzen 7	5700U	8 (16)	1.8	4.3	8 MB	2 × 4	Radeon; Graphics (Note: All of the iGPUs are branded as AMD Radeon Graphics.)	1.9	512:32:8; 8 CU	1945.6	10–25 W	Jan 12, 2021
Ryzen 5	5500U	6 (12)	2.1	4.0	8 MB	2 × 3	Radeon; Graphics	1.8	448:28:8; 7 CU	1612.8	10–25 W	Jan 12, 2021
Ryzen 3	5300U	4 (8)	2.6	3.8	4 MB	1 × 4	Radeon; Graphics	1.5	384:24:8; 6 CU	1152	10–25 W	Jan 12, 2021

==== Cezanne and Barceló (Zen 3/GCN5 based) ====
Cezanne (2021 models), Barceló (2022 models).

Common features of Ryzen 5000 notebook APUs:

- Socket: FP6.
- All the CPUs support DDR4-3200 or LPDDR4-4266 in dual-channel mode.
- L1 cache: 64 KB (32 KB data + 32 KB instruction) per core.
- L2 cache: 512 KB per core.
- All the CPUs support 16 PCIe 3.0 lanes.
- Includes integrated GCN 5th generation GPU.
- Fabrication process: TSMC 7FF.

Branding and model		CPU						GPU				TDP	Release date
Branding and model		Cores (threads)	Clock rate (GHz)			L3 cache (total)	Core config (Note: Core Complexes (CCX) × cores per CCX)	Model	Clock (GHz)	Config (Note: Unified shaders : texture mapping units : render output units and compute units (CU))	Processing power (GFLOPS) (Note: Single precision performance is calculated from the base (or boost) core clock speed based on a FMA operation.)	TDP	Release date
Branding and model		Cores (threads)	Base	Boost (Single Core)	Boost (All Core)	L3 cache (total)	Core config	Model	Clock (GHz)	Config	Processing power (GFLOPS)	TDP	Release date
Ryzen 9	5980HX	8 (16)	3.3	4.8	4.4	16 MB	1 × 8	Radeon; Graphics (Note: All of the iGPUs are branded as AMD Radeon Graphics.)	2.1	512:32:8; 8 CUs	2150.4	35–54 W	Jan 12, 2021
Ryzen 9	5980HS	8 (16)	3.0	4.8	4.0	16 MB	1 × 8	Radeon; Graphics	2.1	512:32:8; 8 CUs	2150.4	35 W	Jan 12, 2021
Ryzen 9	5900HX	8 (16)	3.3	4.6	4.2	16 MB	1 × 8	Radeon; Graphics	2.1	512:32:8; 8 CUs	2150.4	35–54 W	Jan 12, 2021
Ryzen 9	5900HS	8 (16)	3.0	4.6	4.0	16 MB	1 × 8	Radeon; Graphics	2.1	512:32:8; 8 CUs	2150.4	35 W	Jan 12, 2021
Ryzen 7	5800H	8 (16)	3.2	4.4		16 MB	1 × 8	Radeon; Graphics	2.0	512:32:8; 8 CUs	2048	35–54 W	Jan 12, 2021
Ryzen 7	5800HS	8 (16)	2.8	4.4		16 MB	1 × 8	Radeon; Graphics	2.0	512:32:8; 8 CUs	2048	35 W	Jan 12, 2021
Ryzen 7	5825U (Note: Model also available as PRO version as 5450U, 5650U, 5850U, released on March 16, 2021 and as 5475U, 5675U, 5875U, released on April 19, 2022.) (Note: Model also available as Chromebook optimized version as 5425C, 5625C, 5825C, released on May 5, 2022.)	8 (16)	2.0	4.5		16 MB	1 × 8	Radeon; Graphics	2.0	512:32:8; 8 CUs	2048	15 W	Jan 4, 2022
Ryzen 7	5800U	8 (16)	1.9	4.4	3.4	16 MB	1 × 8	Radeon; Graphics	2.0	512:32:8; 8 CUs	2048	10–25 W	Jan 12, 2021
Ryzen 5	5600H	6 (12)	3.3	4.2		16 MB	1 × 6	Radeon; Graphics	1.8	448:28:8; 7 CUs	1612.8	35–54 W	Jan 12, 2021
Ryzen 5	5600HS	6 (12)	3.0	4.2		16 MB	1 × 6	Radeon; Graphics	1.8	448:28:8; 7 CUs	1612.8	35 W	Jan 12, 2021
Ryzen 5	5625U	6 (12)	2.3	4.3	3.6	16 MB	1 × 6	Radeon; Graphics	1.8	448:28:8; 7 CUs	1612.8	15 W	Jan 4, 2022
Ryzen 5	5600U	6 (12)	2.3	4.2	3.6	16 MB	1 × 6	Radeon; Graphics	1.8	448:28:8; 7 CUs	1612.8	10–25 W	Jan 12, 2021
Ryzen 5	5560U	6 (12)	2.3	4.0		8 MB	1 × 6	Radeon; Graphics	1.6	384:24:8; 6 CUs	1228.8	10–25 W	Jan 12, 2021
Ryzen 5	5500H	4 (8)	3.3	4.2		8 MB	1 × 4	Radeon; Graphics	1.8	384:24:8; 6 CUs	1382.4	35–54 W	Jun 23, 2023
Ryzen 3	5425U	4 (8)	2.7	4.1	3.8	8 MB	1 × 4	Radeon; Graphics	1.6	384:24:8; 6 CUs	1228.8	15 W	Jan 4, 2022
Ryzen 3	5400U	4 (8)	2.6	4.0	3.8	8 MB	1 × 4	Radeon; Graphics	1.6	384:24:8; 6 CUs	1228.8	10–25 W	Jan 12, 2021
Ryzen 3	5125C	2 (4)	3.0	—N/a	—N/a	8 MB	1 × 2	Radeon; Graphics	1.2	192:12:8; 3 CUs	460.8	15 W	May 5, 2022

=== Ryzen 6000 series ===
==== Rembrandt (Zen 3+/RDNA2 based) ====
Common features of Ryzen 6000 notebook APUs:

- Socket: FP7, FP7r2.
- All the CPUs support DDR5-4800 or LPDDR5-6400 in dual-channel mode.
- L1 cache: 64 KB (32 KB data + 32 KB instruction) per core.
- L2 cache: 512 KB per core.
- All the CPUs support 16 PCIe 4.0 lanes.
- Native USB 40Gbps (USB4) Ports: 2
- Native USB 10Gbps (USB 3.2 Gen 2 operation mode) Ports: 2
- Includes integrated RDNA 2 GPU.
- Fabrication process: TSMC N6 FinFET.

Branding and model		CPU					GPU				TDP	Release date
Branding and model		Cores (threads)	Clock (GHz)		L3 cache (total)	Core config (Note: Core Complexes (CCX) × cores per CCX)	Model	Clock (GHz)	Config (Note: Unified shaders : texture mapping units : render output units and compute units (CU))	Processing power (GFLOPS) (Note: Single precision performance is calculated from the base (or boost) core clock speed based on a FMA operation.)	TDP	Release date
Branding and model		Cores (threads)	Base	Boost	L3 cache (total)	Core config	Model	Clock (GHz)	Config	Processing power (GFLOPS)	TDP	Release date
Ryzen 9	6980HX	8 (16)	3.3	5.0	16 MB	1 × 8	680M	2.4	768:48:8; 12 CUs	3686	45 W	Jan 4, 2022
Ryzen 9	6980HS	8 (16)	3.3	5.0	16 MB	1 × 8	680M	2.4	768:48:8; 12 CUs	3686	35 W	Jan 4, 2022
Ryzen 9	6900HX (Note: Model also available as PRO version (6650U, 6650H, 6650HS, 6850U, 6850H, 6850HS, 6950H, 6950HS), released on April 19, 2022.)	8 (16)	3.3	4.9	16 MB	1 × 8	680M	2.4	768:48:8; 12 CUs	3686	45 W	Jan 4, 2022
Ryzen 9	6900HS	8 (16)	3.3	4.9	16 MB	1 × 8	680M	2.4	768:48:8; 12 CUs	3686	35 W	Jan 4, 2022
Ryzen 7	6800H	8 (16)	3.2	4.7	16 MB	1 × 8	680M	2.2	768:48:8; 12 CUs	3379	45 W	Jan 4, 2022
Ryzen 7	6800HS	8 (16)	3.2	4.7	16 MB	1 × 8	680M	2.2	768:48:8; 12 CUs	3379	35 W	Jan 4, 2022
Ryzen 7	6800U	8 (16)	2.7	4.7	16 MB	1 × 8	680M	2.2	768:48:8; 12 CUs	3379	15–28 W	Jan 4, 2022
Ryzen 5	6600H	6 (12)	3.3	4.5	16 MB	1 × 6	660M	1.9	384:24:8; 6 CUs	1459	45 W	Jan 4, 2022
Ryzen 5	6600HS	6 (12)	3.3	4.5	16 MB	1 × 6	660M	1.9	384:24:8; 6 CUs	1459	35 W	Jan 4, 2022
Ryzen 5	6600U	6 (12)	2.9	4.5	16 MB	1 × 6	660M	1.9	384:24:8; 6 CUs	1459	15–28 W	Jan 4, 2022

=== Ryzen 7000 series ===
==== Mendocino (7020 series, Zen 2/RDNA2 based) ====
Common features of Ryzen 7020 notebook APUs:

- Socket: FT6
- All the CPUs support LPDDR5-5500 in dual-channel mode.
- L1 cache: 64 KB (32 KB data + 32 KB instruction) per core.
- L2 cache: 512 KB per core.
- All the CPUs support 4 PCIe 3.0 lanes.
- Native USB 40Gbps (USB4) Ports: 0
- Native USB 10Gbps (USB 3.2 Gen 2 operation mode) Ports: 1
- Includes integrated RDNA 2 GPU.
- Fabrication process: TSMC N6 FinFET.

Branding and Model		CPU					GPU			TDP	Release date
Branding and Model		Cores (threads)	Clock rate (GHz)		L3 cache (total)	Core config (Note: Core Complexes (CCX) × cores per CCX)	Model	Clock (GHz)	Processing power (Note: Single precision performance is calculated from the base (or boost) core clock speed based on a FMA operation.) (GFLOPS)	TDP	Release date
Branding and Model		Cores (threads)	Base	Boost	L3 cache (total)	Core config	Model	Clock (GHz)	Processing power (GFLOPS)	TDP	Release date
Ryzen 5	7520U (Note: Model also available as Chromebook optimized version as 7520C and 7320C released on May 23, 2023)	4 (8)	2.8	4.3	4 MB	1 × 4	610M; 2 CU	1.9	486	15 W	September 20, 2022
Ryzen 3	7320U	4 (8)	2.4	4.1	4 MB	1 × 4	610M; 2 CU	1.9	486	15 W	September 20, 2022

==== Barcelo-R (7030 series, Zen 3/GCN5 based) ====
Common features of Ryzen 7030 notebook APUs:

- Socket: FP6.
- All the CPUs support DDR4-3200 or LPDDR4-4266 in dual-channel mode.
- L1 cache: 64 KB (32 KB data + 32 KB instruction) per core.
- L2 cache: 512 KB per core.
- All the CPUs support 16 PCIe 3.0 lanes.
- Native USB 40Gbps (USB4) Ports: 0
- Native USB 10Gbps (USB 3.2 Gen 2 operation mode) Ports: 2
- Includes integrated GCN 5th generation GPU.
- Fabrication process: TSMC N7 FinFET.

Branding and Model		CPU					GPU			TDP	Release date
Branding and Model		Cores (threads)	Clock rate (GHz)		L3 cache (total)	Core config (Note: Core Complexes (CCX) × cores per CCX)	Model	Clock (GHz)	Processing power (Note: Single precision performance is calculated from the base (or boost) core clock speed based on a FMA operation.) (GFLOPS)	TDP	Release date
Branding and Model		Cores (threads)	Base	Boost	L3 cache (total)	Core config	Model	Clock (GHz)	Processing power (GFLOPS)	TDP	Release date
Ryzen 7	(PRO) 7730U	8 (16)	2.0	4.5	16 MB	1 × 8	Vega; 8 CU	2.0	2048	15 W	January 4, 2023
Ryzen 5	(PRO) 7530U	6 (12)	2.0	4.5	16 MB	1 × 6	Vega; 7 CU	2.0	1792	15 W	January 4, 2023
Ryzen 5	7430U	6 (12)	2.3	4.3	16 MB	1 × 6	Vega; 7 CU	1.8	1613	15 W	Q4 2023
Ryzen 3	(PRO) 7330U	4 (8)	2.3	4.3	8 MB	1 × 4	Vega; 6 CU	1.8	1382	15 W	January 4, 2023

==== Rembrandt-R (7035 series, Zen 3+/RDNA2 based) ====
Common features of Ryzen 7035 notebook APUs:

- Socket: FP7, FP7r2.
- All the CPUs support DDR5-4800 or LPDDR5-6400 in dual-channel mode.
- L1 cache: 64 KB (32 KB data + 32 KB instruction) per core.
- L2 cache: 512 KB per core.
- All the CPUs support 16 PCIe 4.0 lanes.
- Native USB 40Gbps (USB4) Ports: 2
- Native USB 10Gbps (USB 3.2 Gen 2 operation mode) Ports: 2
- Includes integrated RDNA 2 GPU.
- Fabrication process: TSMC N6 FinFET.

Branding and model		CPU					GPU			TDP	Release date
Branding and model		Cores (threads)	Clock (GHz)		L3 cache (total)	Core config (Note: Core Complexes (CCX) × cores per CCX)	Model	Clock (GHz)	Processing power (Note: Single precision performance is calculated from the base (or boost) core clock speed based on a FMA operation.) (GFLOPS)	TDP	Release date
Branding and model		Cores (threads)	Base	Boost	L3 cache (total)	Core config	Model	Clock (GHz)	Processing power (GFLOPS)	TDP	Release date
Ryzen 7	7735HS	8 (16)	3.2	4.75	16 MB	1 × 8	680M; 12 CU	2.2	3379	35–54 W	April 30, 2023
Ryzen 7	7735H	8 (16)	3.2	4.75	16 MB	1 × 8	680M; 12 CU	2.2	3379	35–54 W	April 30, 2023
Ryzen 7	7736U	8 (16)	2.7	4.7	16 MB	1 × 8	680M; 12 CU	2.2	3379	15–28 W	January 4, 2023
Ryzen 7	7735U	8 (16)	2.7	4.75	16 MB	1 × 8	680M; 12 CU	2.2	3379	15–30 W	January 4, 2023
Ryzen 7	7435HS	8 (16)	3.1	4.5	16 MB	1 × 8	—N/a			35–54 W	2024
Ryzen 7	7435H	8 (16)	3.1	4.5	16 MB	1 × 8	—N/a			35–54 W	2024
Ryzen 5	7535HS	6 (12)	3.3	4.55	16 MB	1 × 6	660M; 6 CU	1.9	1459	35–54 W	April 30, 2023
Ryzen 5	7535H	6 (12)	3.3	4.55	16 MB	1 × 6	660M; 6 CU	1.9	1459	35–54 W	April 30, 2023
Ryzen 5	7535U	6 (12)	2.9	4.55	16 MB	1 × 6	660M; 6 CU	1.9	1459	15–30 W	January 4, 2023
Ryzen 5	7235HS	4 (8)	3.2	4.2	8 MB	1 × 4	—N/a			35–53 W	2024
Ryzen 5	7235H	4 (8)	3.2	4.2	8 MB	1 × 4	—N/a			35–53 W	2024
Ryzen 3	7335U	4 (8)	3.0	4.3	8 MB	1 × 4	660M; 4 CU	1.8	922	15–30 W	January 4, 2023

==== Phoenix (7040 series, Zen 4/RDNA3/XDNA based) ====
Common features of Ryzen 7040 notebook APUs:

- Socket: FP7, FP7r2, FP8.
- All the CPUs support DDR5-5600 or LPDDR5X-7500 in dual-channel mode.
- L1 cache: 64 KB (32 KB data + 32 KB instruction) per core.
- L2 cache: 1 MB per core.
- All models support AVX-512 using a half-width 256-bit FPU.
- PCIe 4.0 support.
- Native USB 40Gbps (USB4) Ports: 2
- Native USB 10Gbps (USB 3.2 Gen 2 operation mode) Ports: 2
- Includes integrated RDNA 3 GPU.
- Some models include XDNA AI Engine (Ryzen AI) NPU capable of 10 TOPS.
- Fabrication process: TSMC N4 FinFET.

Branding and model		CPU							GPU		NPU (Ryzen AI)	TDP	Release date
Branding and model		Cores (threads)			Clock (GHz)		L3 cache (total)	Core config (Note: Core Complexes (CCX) × cores per CCX or Zen 4 + Zen 4c cores)	Model	Clock (GHz)	NPU (Ryzen AI)	TDP	Release date
Branding and model		Total	Zen 4	Zen 4c	Base	Boost	L3 cache (total)	Core config	Model	Clock (GHz)	NPU (Ryzen AI)	TDP	Release date
Ryzen 9	(PRO) 7940HS	8 (16)	8 (16)	—N/a	4.0	5.2	16 MB	1 × 8	780M; 12 CU	2.8	Yes; 10 TOPS	35-54 W	April 30, 2023 (Note: PRO versions launched on 13 June 2023.)
Ryzen 9	7940H (Note: China-only version of the HS SKU that lacks support for AMD EXPO and FreeSync technologies.)	8 (16)	8 (16)	—N/a	4.0	5.2	16 MB	1 × 8	780M; 12 CU	2.8	Yes; 10 TOPS	35-54 W	April 30, 2023
Ryzen 7	(PRO) 7840HS	8 (16)	8 (16)	—N/a	3.8	5.1	16 MB	1 × 8	780M; 12 CU	2.7	Yes; 10 TOPS	35-54 W	April 30, 2023
Ryzen 7	7840H	8 (16)	8 (16)	—N/a	3.8	5.1	16 MB	1 × 8	780M; 12 CU	2.7	Yes; 10 TOPS	35-54 W	April 30, 2023
Ryzen 7	(PRO) 7840U	8 (16)	8 (16)	—N/a	3.3	5.1	16 MB	1 × 8	780M; 12 CU	2.7	Yes; 10 TOPS	15-30 W	May 3, 2023
Ryzen 7	7445HS	6 (12)	2 (4)	4 (8)	3.2	4.7	16 MB	2 + 4	740M; 4 CU	2.7	No	20-40 W	May 3, 2023
Ryzen 5	(PRO) 7640HS	6 (12)	6 (12)	—N/a	4.3	5.0	16 MB	1 × 6	760M; 8 CU	2.6	Yes; 10 TOPS	35-54 W	April 30, 2023
Ryzen 5	7640H	6 (12)	6 (12)	—N/a	4.3	5.0	16 MB	1 × 6	760M; 8 CU	2.6	Yes; 10 TOPS	35-54 W	April 30, 2023
Ryzen 5	(PRO) 7640U	6 (12)	6 (12)	—N/a	3.5	4.9	16 MB	1 × 6	760M; 8 CU	2.6	Yes; 10 TOPS	15-30 W	May 3, 2023
Ryzen 5	(PRO) 7545U	6 (12)	2 (4)	4 (8)	3.7 / 3.0 (Note: Zen 4 cores' base frequency / Zen 4c cores' base frequency)	4.9 / 3.5 (Note: Zen 4 cores' boost frequency / Zen 4c cores' boost frequency)	16 MB	2 + 4	740M; 4 CU	2.8	No	15-30 W	November 2, 2023
Ryzen 5	(PRO) 7540U	6 (12)	6 (12)	—N/a	3.2	4.9	16 MB	1 × 6	740M; 4 CU	2.5	No	15-30 W	May 3, 2023
Ryzen 3	7440U	4 (8)	1 (2)	3 (6)	3.6 / 2.8	4.7 / 3.3	8 MB	1 + 3	740M; 4 CU	2.5	No	15-30 W	May 3, 2023

==== Dragon Range (7045 series, Zen 4/RDNA2 based) ====
Common features of Ryzen 7045 notebook CPUs:

- Socket: FL1.
- All the CPUs support DDR5-5200 in dual-channel mode.
- L1 cache: 64 KB (32 KB data + 32 KB instruction) per core.
- L2 cache: 1 MB per core.
- All the CPUs support 28 PCIe 5.0 lanes.
- Native USB 40Gbps (USB4) Ports: 0
- Native USB 10Gbps (USB 3.2 Gen 2 operation mode) Ports: 4
- Includes integrated RDNA 2 GPU on the I/O die with 2 CUs and clock speeds of 400 MHz (base), 2.2 GHz (boost) (Note: Self identifies as "AMD Radeon 610M". See RDNA 2 § Integrated graphics processors (iGPs).).
- Fabrication process: TSMC N5 FinFET (N6 FinFET for the I/O and graphics die).

Branding and model		Cores (threads)	Clock (GHz)		L3 cache (total)	Chiplets	Core config (Note: Core Complexes (CCX) × cores per CCX)	TDP	Release date
Branding and model		Cores (threads)	Base	Boost	L3 cache (total)	Chiplets	Core config	TDP	Release date
Ryzen 9	7945HX3D	16 (32)	2.3	5.4	128 MB (Note: Only one of the two CCXes has additional 64 MB of 3D V-Cache. Only the CCX without 3D V-Cache will be able to reach the maximum boost clocks. The CCX with 3D V-Cache will clock lower.)	2 × CCD; 1 × I/OD	2 × 8	55–75 W	July 27, 2023
Ryzen 9	7945HX	16 (32)	2.5	5.4	64 MB	2 × CCD; 1 × I/OD	2 × 8	55–75 W	February 28, 2023
Ryzen 9	7940HX	16 (32)	2.4	5.2	64 MB	2 × CCD; 1 × I/OD	2 × 8	55–75 W	January 17, 2024
Ryzen 9	7845HX	12 (24)	3.0	5.2	64 MB	2 × CCD; 1 × I/OD	2 × 6	45–75 W	February 28, 2023
Ryzen 7	7840HX	12 (24)	2.9	5.1	64 MB	2 × CCD; 1 × I/OD	2 × 6	45–75 W	January 17, 2024
Ryzen 7	7745HX	8 (16)	3.6	5.1	32 MB	1 × CCD; 1 × I/OD	1 × 8	45–75 W	February 28, 2023
Ryzen 5	7645HX	6 (12)	4.0	5.0	32 MB	1 × CCD; 1 × I/OD	1 × 6	45–75 W	February 28, 2023

=== Ryzen 8000 series ===
==== Hawk Point (8040 series, Zen 4/RDNA3/XDNA based) ====
Key features of Ryzen 8040 notebook APUs:

- Socket: BGA (FP7, FP7r2 or FP8 type packages).
- All models support DDR5-5600 or LPDDR5X-7500 in dual-channel mode.
- CPU uses Zen4 cores (Phoenix) or a combination of Zen4 and Zen4c cores (Phoenix2).
- GPU uses the RDNA 3 (Navi 3) architecture.
- Some models include first-generation Ryzen AI NPU (XDNA) capable of 16 TOPS.
- All models support AVX-512 using a half-width 256-bit FPU.
- PCIe 4.0 support.
- Native USB 40Gbps (USB4) Ports: 2
- Native USB 10Gbps (USB 3.2 Gen 2 operation mode) Ports: 2
- Fabrication process: TSMC N4 FinFET.

Branding and model		CPU							GPU		NPU (Ryzen AI)	TDP	Release date
Branding and model		Cores (threads)			Clock (GHz)		L3 cache (total)	Core config (Note: Core Complexes (CCX) × cores per CCX or Zen 4 + Zen 4c cores)	Model	Clock (GHz)	NPU (Ryzen AI)	TDP	Release date
Branding and model		Total	Zen 4	Zen 4c	Base	Boost	L3 cache (total)	Core config	Model	Clock (GHz)	NPU (Ryzen AI)	TDP	Release date
Ryzen 9	8945HS	8 (16)	8 (16)	—	4.0	5.2	16 MB	1 × 8	780M 12 CU	2.8	Yes; 16 TOPS	35-54 W	December 6, 2023
Ryzen 7	8845HS	8 (16)	8 (16)	—	3.8	5.1	16 MB	1 × 8	780M 12 CU	2.7	Yes; 16 TOPS	35-54 W	December 6, 2023
Ryzen 7	8840HS	8 (16)	8 (16)	—	3.3	5.1	16 MB	1 × 8	780M 12 CU	2.7	Yes; 16 TOPS	20-30 W	December 6, 2023
Ryzen 7	8840U	8 (16)	8 (16)	—	3.3	5.1	16 MB	1 × 8	780M 12 CU	2.7	Yes; 16 TOPS	15-30 W	December 6, 2023
Ryzen 7	8745HS	8 (16)	8 (16)	—	3.8	4.9	16 MB	1 × 8	780M 12 CU	2.6	No	35–54 W	?
Ryzen 7	8745H	8 (16)	8 (16)	—	3.8	4.9	16 MB	1 × 8	780M 12 CU	2.6	No	35–54 W	?
Ryzen 5	8645HS	6 (12)	6 (12)	—	4.3	5.0	16 MB	1 × 6	760M 8 CU	2.6	Yes; 16 TOPS	35-54 W	December 6, 2023
Ryzen 5	8640HS	6 (12)	6 (12)	—	3.5	4.9	16 MB	1 × 6	760M 8 CU	2.6	Yes; 16 TOPS	20-30 W	December 6, 2023
Ryzen 5	8640U	6 (12)	6 (12)	—	3.5	4.9	16 MB	1 × 6	760M 8 CU	2.6	Yes; 16 TOPS	15-30 W	December 6, 2023
Ryzen 5	8540U	6 (12)	2 (4)	4 (8)	3.7 / 3.0 (Note: Zen 4 cores' base frequency / Zen 4c cores' base frequency)	4.9 / 3.5 (Note: Zen 4 cores' boost frequency / Zen 4c cores' boost frequency)	16 MB	2 + 4	740M 4 CU	2.8	No	15-30 W	?
Ryzen 3	8440U	4 (8)	1 (2)	3 (6)	3.6 / 2.8	4.7 / 3.3	8 MB	1 + 3	740M 4 CU	2.5	No	15-30 W	?

==== Dragon Range Refresh (8045 series, Zen4/RDNA2 based) ====
Common features of Ryzen 8045 notebook CPUs:

- Socket: FL1.
- All the CPUs support DDR5-5200 in dual-channel mode.
- L1 cache: 64 KB (32 KB data + 32 KB instruction) per core.
- L2 cache: 1 MB per core.
- All the CPUs support 28 PCIe 5.0 lanes.
- Native USB 40Gbps (USB4) Ports: 0
- Native USB 10Gbps (USB 3.2 Gen 2 operation mode) Ports: 4
- Includes integrated RDNA 2 GPU on the I/O die with 2 CUs and clock speeds of 400 MHz (base), 2.2 GHz (boost) (Note: Self identifies as "AMD Radeon 610M". See RDNA 2 § Integrated graphics processors (iGPs).).
- Fabrication process: TSMC N5 FinFET (N6 FinFET for the I/O and graphics die).

Branding and model		Cores (threads)	Clock (GHz)		L3 cache (total)	Chiplets	Core config (Note: Core Complexes (CCX) × cores per CCX)	TDP	Release date
Branding and model		Cores (threads)	Base	Boost	L3 cache (total)	Chiplets	Core config	TDP	Release date
Ryzen 9	8945HX	16 (32)	2.5	5.4	64 MB	2 × CCD; 1 × I/OD	2 × 8	55–75 W	April 23, 2025
Ryzen 9	8940HX	16 (32)	2.4	5.3	64 MB	2 × CCD; 1 × I/OD	2 × 8	55–75 W	April 23, 2025
Ryzen 7	8840HX	12 (24)	2.9	5.1	64 MB	2 × CCD; 1 × I/OD	2 × 6	45–75 W	April 23, 2025
Ryzen 7	8745HX	8 (16)	3.6	5.1	32 MB	1 × CCD; 1 × I/OD	1 × 8	45–75 W	April 23, 2025

=== Ryzen 9000 series ===
==== Fire Range (Zen 5/RDNA2 based) ====
Common features of Ryzen 9000 Fire Range series:

- Socket: FL1
- All Models support DDR5-5600 in 128-bit mode; Maximum memory: 96 GB
- All models support 28 PCIe 5.0 lanes
- Native USB 10Gbps (USB 3.2 Gen 2 operation mode) : 4
- Native USB 2.0 (480 Mbit/s): 1
- iGPU: AMD Radeon 610M (2 CU @ 2200 MHz)
- No NPU
- L1 cache: 80 KB (48 KB data + 32 KB instruction) per core
- L2 cache: 1 MB per core
- Fabrication process: TSMC N4 FinFET (CCD) + TSMC N6 FinFET (I/OD)

Branding and Model		Cores (threads)	Clock (GHz)		L3 cache (total)	Chiplets	Core config	TDP	Release date
Branding and Model		Cores (threads)	Base	Boost	L3 cache (total)	Chiplets	Core config	TDP	Release date
Ryzen 9	9955HX3D	16 (32)	2.3	5.4	128 MB	2 × CCD; 1 × I/OD	2 × 8	55–75 W	1H 2025
Ryzen 9	9955HX	16 (32)	2.5	5.4	64 MB	2 × CCD; 1 × I/OD	2 × 8	55–75 W	1H 2025
Ryzen 9	9850HX	12 (24)	3.0	5.2	64 MB	2 × CCD; 1 × I/OD	2 × 6	45–75 W	1H 2025

=== Ryzen 10 series ===
==== Mendocino (10 series, Zen 2/RDNA2 based) ====
Common features of Ryzen 10 notebook APUs:

- Socket: FT6
- All the CPUs support LPDDR5-5500 in dual-channel mode.
- L1 cache: 64 KB (32 KB data + 32 KB instruction) per core.
- L2 cache: 512 KB per core.
- All the CPUs support 4 PCIe 3.0 lanes.
- Native USB 40Gbps (USB4) Ports: 0
- Native USB 10Gbps (USB 3.2 Gen 2 operation mode) Ports: 1
- Includes integrated RDNA 2 GPU.
- Fabrication process: TSMC N6 FinFET.

Branding and Model		CPU					GPU			TDP	Release date
Branding and Model		Cores (threads)	Clock rate (GHz)		L3 cache (total)	Core config (Note: Core Complexes (CCX) × cores per CCX)	Model	Clock (GHz)	Processing power (GFLOPS)	TDP	Release date
Branding and Model		Cores (threads)	Base	Boost	L3 cache (total)	Core config	Model	Clock (GHz)	Processing power (GFLOPS)	TDP	Release date
Ryzen 5	40	4 (8)	2.8	4.3	4 MB	1 × 4	610M; 2 CU	1.9	486	15 W	October 1, 2025
Ryzen 3	30	4 (8)	2.4	4.1	4 MB	1 × 4	610M; 2 CU	1.9	486	15 W	October 1, 2025

=== Ryzen 100 series ===
==== Rembrandt-R (100 series, Zen 3+/RDNA2 based) ====
Common features of Ryzen 100 notebook APUs:

- Socket: FP7, FP7r2.
- All the CPUs support DDR5-4800 or LPDDR5-6400 in dual-channel mode.
- L1 cache: 64 KB (32 KB data + 32 KB instruction) per core.
- L2 cache: 512 KB per core.
- All the CPUs support 16 PCIe 4.0 lanes.
- Native USB 40Gbps (USB4) Ports: 0
- Native USB 10Gbps (USB 3.2 Gen 2 operation mode) Ports: 2
- Includes integrated RDNA 2 GPU.
- Fabrication process: TSMC N6 FinFET.

Branding and model		CPU					GPU			TDP (cTDP)	Release date
Branding and model		Cores (threads)	Clock (GHz)		L3 cache (total)	Core config (Note: Core Complexes (CCX) × cores per CCX)	Model	Clock (GHz)	Processing power (Note: Single precision performance is calculated from the base (or boost) core clock speed based on a FMA operation.) (GFLOPS)	TDP (cTDP)	Release date
Branding and model		Cores (threads)	Base	Boost	L3 cache (total)	Core config	Model	Clock (GHz)	Processing power (GFLOPS)	TDP (cTDP)	Release date
Ryzen 7	170	8 (16)	3.2	4.75	16 MB	1 × 8	680M; 12 CU	2.2	3379	45 W (35–54 W)	October 1, 2025
Ryzen 7	160	8 (16)	2.7	4.75	16 MB	1 × 8	680M; 12 CU	2.2	3379	28 W (15–30 W)	October 1, 2025
Ryzen 5	150	6 (12)	3.3	4.55	16 MB	1 × 6	660M; 6 CU	1.9	1459	45 W (35–54 W)	October 1, 2025
Ryzen 5	130	6 (12)	2.9	4.55	16 MB	1 × 6	660M; 6 CU	1.9	1459	28 W (15–30 W)	October 1, 2025
Ryzen 3	110	4 (8)	3.0	4.3	8 MB	1 × 4	660M; 4 CU	1.8	922	28 W (15–30 W)	October 1, 2025

==== Hawk Point Refresh (100 series, Zen 4/RDNA3/XDNA based) ====
Branding and model		CPU					GPU		NPU (Ryzen AI)	TDP (cTDP)	Release date
Branding and model		Cores (threads)	Clock (GHz)		L3 cache (total)	Core config (Note: Core Complexes (CCX) × cores per CCX)	Model	Clock (GHz)	NPU (Ryzen AI)	TDP (cTDP)	Release date
Branding and model		Cores (threads)	Base	Boost	L3 cache (total)	Core config	Model	Clock (GHz)	NPU (Ryzen AI)	TDP (cTDP)	Release date
Ryzen 9	180	8 (16)	3.6	4.9	16 MB	1 × 8	780M 12 CU	2.5	Yes 16 TOPS	45 W (35−54 W)	June 2, 2026
Ryzen 7	165	6 (12)	3.3	4.7	16 MB	1 × 6	760M 8 CU	2.4	Yes 16 TOPS	28 W (15−30 W)	June 2, 2026
Ryzen 7	155	6 (12)	3.0	4.7	16 MB	1 × 6	740M 4 CU	2.6	No	35 W (15−40 W)	June 2, 2026
Ryzen 5	125	4 (8)	2.8	4.5	8 MB	1 × 4	740M 4 CU	2.3	No	28 W (15−40 W)	June 2, 2026

=== Ryzen 200 series ===
==== Hawk Point Refresh (200 series, Zen 4/RDNA3/XDNA based) ====
Branding and Model		CPU							GPU		NPU (Ryzen AI)	TDP (cTDP)	Release date
Branding and Model		Cores (threads)			Clock (GHz)		L3 cache (total)	Core config	Model	Clock (GHz)	NPU (Ryzen AI)	TDP (cTDP)	Release date
Branding and Model		Total	Zen 4	Zen 4c	Base	Boost	L3 cache (total)	Core config	Model	Clock (GHz)	NPU (Ryzen AI)	TDP (cTDP)	Release date
Ryzen 9	270	8 (16)	8 (16)	-	4.0	5.2	16 MB	1 × 8	780M; 12 CU	2.8	Yes 16 TOPS	45 W (35−54 W)	February 18, 2025
Ryzen 7	260	8 (16)	8 (16)	-	3.8	5.1	16 MB	1 × 8	780M; 12 CU	2.7	Yes 16 TOPS	45 W (35−54 W)	February 18, 2025
Ryzen 7	(PRO) 253	8 (16)	8 (16)	-	3.6	4.9	16 MB	1 × 8	780M; 12 CU	2.5	Yes 16 TOPS	45 W (35−54 W)	June 2, 2026
Ryzen 7	(PRO) 250	8 (16)	8 (16)	-	3.3	5.1	16 MB	1 × 8	780M; 12 CU	2.7	Yes 16 TOPS	28 W (15−30 W)	(March 27, 2025) February 18, 2025
Ryzen 7	(PRO) 249	8 (16)	8 (16)	-	3.1	4.9	16 MB	1 × 8	780M; 12 CU	2.5	Yes 16 TOPS	28 W (15−30 W)	June 2, 2026
Ryzen 7	(PRO) 217	6 (12)	2 (4)	4 (8)	3.0	4.8	16 MB	2 + 4	740M; 4 CU	2.6	No	35 W (15−40 W)	June 2, 2026
Ryzen 5	240	6 (12)	6 (12)	-	4.3	5.0	16 MB	1 × 6	760M; 8 CU	2.6	Yes 16 TOPS	45 W (35−54 W)	(March 27, 2025) February 18, 2025
Ryzen 5	(PRO) 230	6 (12)	6 (12)	-	3.5	4.9	16 MB	1 × 6	760M; 8 CU	2.6	Yes 16 TOPS	28 W (15−30 W)	(March 27, 2025) February 18, 2025
Ryzen 5	(PRO) 225	6 (12)	6 (12)	-	(3.3) 4.1	4.8	16 MB	1 × 6	760M; 8 CU	2.4	Yes 16 TOPS	45 W (35−54 W)	June 2, 2026
Ryzen 5	(PRO) 224	6 (12)	6 (12)	-	3.3	4.8	16 MB	1 × 6	760M; 8 CU	2.4	Yes 16 TOPS	28 W (15−30 W)	June 2, 2026
Ryzen 5	(PRO) 220	6 (12)	2 (4)	4 (8)	3.7 / 3.0	4.9 / 3.5	16 MB	2 + 4	740M; 4 CU	2.8	No	28 W (15−30 W)	(March 27, 2025) February 18, 2025
Ryzen 5	(PRO) 216	6 (12)	2 (4)	4 (8)	2.9	4.7	16 MB	2 + 4	740M; 4 CU	2.5	No	35 W (15−40 W)	June 2, 2026
Ryzen 5	PRO 215	6 (12)	2 (4)	4 (8)	3.2 / 3.2	4.7 / 3.55	16 MB	2 + 4	740M; 4 CU	2.7	No	28 W (15−30 W)	March 27, 2025
Ryzen 3	(PRO) 210	4 (8)	1 (2)	3 (6)	3.6 / 2.8	4.7 / 3.3	8 MB	1 + 3	740M; 4 CU	2.5	No	28 W (15−30 W)	(March 27, 2025) February 18, 2025
Ryzen 3	(PRO) 205	4 (8)	1 (2)	3 (6)	2.8	4.6	8 MB	1 + 3	740M; 4 CU	2.3	No	28 W (15−40 W)	June 2, 2026

=== Ryzen AI 300 series ===
==== Strix Point and Krackan Point (Zen 5/RDNA3.5/XDNA2 based) ====
Common features of Ryzen AI 300 notebook APUs:

- Socket: BGA, FP8 package type.
- All models support DDR5-5600 or LPDDR5X-8000 in dual-channel mode.
- All models support 16 PCIe 4.0 lanes.
- Native USB 40Gbps (USB4) Ports: 2
- Native USB 10Gbps (USB 3.2 Gen 2 operation mode) Ports: 2
- iGPU uses the RDNA 3.5 microarchitecture.
- NPU uses the XDNA 2 AI Engine (Ryzen AI).
- Both Zen 5 and Zen 5c cores support AVX-512 using a half-width 256-bit FPU.
- L1 cache: 80 KB (48 KB data + 32 KB instruction) per core.
- L2 cache: 1 MB per core.
- Fabrication process: TSMC N4P FinFET.

Branding and model		CPU							GPU		NPU (Ryzen AI)	TDP (cTDP)	Release date
Branding and model		Cores (threads)			Clock (GHz)			L3 cache (total)	Model	Clock (GHz)	NPU (Ryzen AI)	TDP (cTDP)	Release date
Branding and model		Total	Zen 5	Zen 5c	Base	Boost (Zen 5)	Boost (Zen 5c)	L3 cache (total)	Model	Clock (GHz)	NPU (Ryzen AI)	TDP (cTDP)	Release date
Ryzen AI 9	(PRO) HX 375	12 (24)	4 (8)	8 (16)	2.0	5.1	3.3	24 MB	890M; 16 CUs	2.9	55 TOPS	28 W (15−54 W)	June 2, 2024
Ryzen AI 9	(PRO) HX 370	12 (24)	4 (8)	8 (16)	2.0	5.1	3.3	24 MB	890M; 16 CUs	2.9	50 TOPS	28 W (15−54 W)	June 2, 2024
Ryzen AI 9	365	10 (20)	4 (8)	6 (12)	2.0	5.0	3.3	24 MB	880M; 12 CUs	2.9	50 TOPS	28 W (15−54 W)	June 2, 2024
Ryzen AI 7	PRO 360	8 (16)	3 (6)	5 (10)	2.0	5.0	3.3	16 MB	880M; 12 CUs	2.9	50 TOPS	28 W (15−54 W)	October 10, 2024
Ryzen AI 7	(PRO) 350	8 (16)	4 (8)	4 (8)	2.0	5.0	3.5	16 MB	860M; 8 CU	3.0	50 TOPS	28 W (15−54 W)	(March 27, 2025) February 18, 2025
Ryzen AI 5	(PRO) 340	6 (12)	3 (6)	3 (6)	2.0	4.8	3.4	16 MB	840M; 4 CU	2.9	50 TOPS	28 W (15−54 W)	(March 27, 2025) February 18, 2025
Ryzen AI 5	330	4 (8)	1 (2)	3 (6)	2.0	4.5	3.4	8 MB	820M; 2 CU	2.8	50 TOPS	28 W (15−28 W)	July 2025

==== Strix Halo (Zen 5/RDNA3.5/XDNA2 based) ====
Common features of Strix Halo mobile CPUs:

- Socket: BGA, FP11 package type.
- All CPUs only support soldered LPDDR5X memory with a 256-bit memory bus.
- All CPUs support 16 PCIe 4.0 lanes.
- Native USB 40Gbps (USB4) Ports: 2
- Native USB 10Gbps (USB 3.2 Gen 2 operation mode) Ports: 3
- NVMe Support: Boot, RAID0, RAID1
- iGPU uses the RDNA 3.5 microarchitecture.
- NPU uses the XDNA 2 AI Engine (Ryzen AI).
- Zen 5 cores support AVX-512 using a full-width 512-bit FPU.
- L2 cache: 1 MB per core.
- Fabrication process: TSMC N4P FinFET.

Branding and Model		CPU				GPU		Memory			NPU (Ryzen AI)	Chiplets	Core config	TDP	Release date
Branding and Model		Cores (threads)	Clock (GHz)		L3 cache (total)	Model	Clock (GHz)	Bus type & width (Max memory)	Clock (MT/s)	Bandwidth (GB/s)	NPU (Ryzen AI)	Chiplets	Core config	TDP	Release date
Branding and Model		Cores (threads)	Base	Boost	L3 cache (total)	Model	Clock (GHz)	Bus type & width (Max memory)	Clock (MT/s)	Bandwidth (GB/s)	NPU (Ryzen AI)	Chiplets	Core config	TDP	Release date
Ryzen AI MAX+	(PRO) 395	16 (32)	3.0	5.1	64 MB	8060S; 40 CUs	2.9	LPDDR5X; 256-bit (128 GB)	Up to 8000	Up to 256	50 TOPS	2 × CCD; 1 × I/OD with GPU	2 × 8	45–120 W	Q1 2025
Ryzen AI MAX+	392	12 (24)	3.2	5.0	64 MB	8060S; 40 CUs	2.9	LPDDR5X; 256-bit (128 GB)	Up to 8000	Up to 256	50 TOPS	2 × CCD; 1 × I/OD with GPU	2 × 6	45–120 W	Q1 2026
Ryzen AI MAX	(PRO) 390	12 (24)	3.2	5.0	64 MB	8050S; 32 CUs	2.8	LPDDR5X; 256-bit (128 GB)	Up to 8000	Up to 256	50 TOPS	2 × CCD; 1 × I/OD with GPU	2 × 6	45–120 W	Q1 2025
Ryzen AI MAX+	388	8 (16)	3.6	5.0	32 MB	8060S; 40 CUs	2.9	LPDDR5X; 256-bit (128 GB)	Up to 8000	Up to 256	50 TOPS	1 × CCD; 1 × I/OD with GPU	1 × 8	45–120 W	Q1 2026
Ryzen AI MAX	(PRO) 385	8 (16)	3.6	5.0	32 MB	8050S; 32 CUs	2.8	LPDDR5X; 256-bit (128 GB)	Up to 8000	Up to 256	50 TOPS	1 × CCD; 1 × I/OD with GPU	1 × 8	45–120 W	Q1 2025
Ryzen AI MAX	PRO 380	6 (12)	3.6	4.9	16 MB	8040S; 16 CUs	2.8	LPDDR5X; 128-bit (64 GB)	Up to 8000	Up to 128	50 TOPS	1 × CCD; 1 × I/OD with GPU	1 × 6	45–120 W	Q1 2025

=== Ryzen AI 400 series ===
==== Gorgon Point (Zen 5/RDNA3.5/XDNA2 based) ====
Common features of Ryzen AI 400 notebook APUs:

- Socket: BGA, FP8 package type.
- All models support DDR5-5600 or LPDDR5X-8000 (LPDDR5X-8533 for 440, 450, 465, 470, 475 series) in dual-channel mode.
- All models support 16 PCIe 4.0 lanes.
- Native USB 40Gbps (USB4) Ports: 2
- Native USB 10Gbps (USB 3.2 Gen 2 operation mode) Ports: 2
- iGPU uses the RDNA 3.5 microarchitecture.
- NPU uses the XDNA 2 AI Engine (Ryzen AI).
- Both Zen 5 and Zen 5c cores support AVX-512 using a half-width 256-bit FPU.
- L1 cache: 80 KB (48 KB data + 32 KB instruction) per core.
- L2 cache: 1 MB per core.
- Fabrication process: TSMC N4P FinFET.

Branding and model		CPU							GPU		NPU (Ryzen AI)	TDP	Release date
Branding and model		Cores (threads)			Clock (GHz)			L3 cache (total)	Model	Clock (GHz)	NPU (Ryzen AI)	TDP	Release date
Branding and model		Total	Zen 5	Zen 5c	Base	Boost (Zen 5)	Boost (Zen 5c)	L3 cache (total)	Model	Clock (GHz)	NPU (Ryzen AI)	TDP	Release date
Ryzen AI 9	(PRO) HX 475	12 (24)	4 (8)	8 (16)	2.0	5.2	3.3	24 MB	890M; 16 CUs	3.1	60 TOPS	15–54 W	January 5, 2026
Ryzen AI 9	(PRO) HX 470	12 (24)	4 (8)	8 (16)	2.0	5.2	3.3	24 MB	890M; 16 CUs	3.1	55 TOPS	15–54 W	January 5, 2026
Ryzen AI 9	(PRO) 465 (Note: Model also available as "H" version as H 430, H 435, H PRO 435, H PRO 440, H 445, H PRO 445, H 450, H PRO 450, H 465, and H PRO 465, but lacks support for AMD EXPO and FreeSync technologies.)	10 (20)	4 (8)	6 (12)	2.0	5.0	3.3	24 MB	880M; 12 CUs	2.9	50 TOPS	15–54 W	January 5, 2026
Ryzen AI 7	(PRO) 450	8 (16)	4 (8)	4 (8)	2.0	5.1	3.6	16 MB	860M; 8 CUs	3.1	50 TOPS	15–54 W	January 5, 2026
Ryzen AI 7	445	6 (12)	2 (4)	4 (8)	2.0	4.6	3.5	8 MB	840M; 4 CUs	2.9	50 TOPS	15–54 W	January 5, 2026
Ryzen AI 5	PRO 440	6 (12)	3 (6)	3 (6)	2.0	4.8	3.5	16 MB	840M; 4 CUs	2.9	50 TOPS	15–54 W	January 5, 2026
Ryzen AI 5	(PRO) 435	6 (12)	2 (4)	4 (8)	2.0	4.5	3.4	8 MB	840M; 4 CUs	2.8	50 TOPS	15–54 W	January 5, 2026
Ryzen AI 5	430	4 (8)	1 (2)	3 (6)	2.0	4.5	3.4	8 MB	840M; 4 CUs	2.8	50 TOPS	15–28 W	January 5, 2026

==== Gorgon Halo (Zen 5/RDNA3.5/XDNA2 based) ====
Common features of Ryzen AI Max PRO 400 notebook APUs:

- Socket: BGA, FP11 package type.
- All CPUs only support soldered LPDDR5X memory with a 256-bit memory bus.
- All CPUs support 16 PCIe 4.0 lanes.
- Native USB 40Gbps (USB4) Ports: 2
- Native USB 10Gbps (USB 3.2 Gen 2 operation mode) Ports: 3
- NVMe Support: Boot, RAID0, RAID1
- iGPU uses the RDNA 3.5 microarchitecture.
- NPU uses the XDNA 2 AI Engine (Ryzen AI).
- Zen 5 cores support AVX-512 using a half-width 256-bit FPU.
- L2 cache: 1 MB per core.
- Fabrication process: TSMC N4P FinFET.

Branding and Model		CPU				GPU		Memory			NPU (Ryzen AI)	Chiplets	Core config	TDP	Release date
Branding and Model		Cores (threads)	Clock (GHz)		L3 cache (total)	Model	Clock (GHz)	Bus type & width (Max memory)	Clock (MT/s)	Bandwidth (GB/s)	NPU (Ryzen AI)	Chiplets	Core config	TDP	Release date
Branding and Model		Cores (threads)	Base	Boost	L3 cache (total)	Model	Clock (GHz)	Bus type & width (Max memory)	Clock (MT/s)	Bandwidth (GB/s)	NPU (Ryzen AI)	Chiplets	Core config	TDP	Release date
Ryzen AI MAX+	PRO 495	16 (32)	3.1	5.2	64 MB	8065S; 40 CUs	3.0	LPDDR5X; 256-bit (192 GB)	Up to 8533	Up to 273	55 TOPS	2 × CCD; 1 × I/OD with GPU	2 × 8	55W cTDP: 45–120 W	Q3 2026
Ryzen AI MAX	PRO 490	12 (24)	3.2	5.0	64 MB	8050S; 32 CUs	2.8	LPDDR5X; 256-bit (192 GB)	Up to 8533	Up to 273	50 TOPS	2 × CCD; 1 × I/OD with GPU	2 × 6	55W cTDP: 45–120 W	Q3 2026
Ryzen AI MAX	PRO 485	8 (16)	3.6	5.0	32 MB	8050S; 32 CUs	2.8	LPDDR5X; 256-bit (192 GB)	Up to 8533	Up to 273	50 TOPS	1 × CCD; 1 × I/OD with GPU	1 × 8	55W cTDP: 45–120 W	Q3 2026

== Handheld gaming PC processors ==
=== Ryzen Z1 series (Zen 4/RDNA3 based) ===
Common features of Ryzen Z1 handheld APUs:

- Socket: FP7, FP7r2, FP8.
- All the CPUs support DDR5-5600 or LPDDR5X-7500 in dual-channel mode.
- L1 cache: 64 KB (32 KB data + 32 KB instruction) per core.
- L2 cache: 1 MB per core.
- All the CPUs support 20 PCIe 4.0 lanes.
- Includes integrated RDNA 3 GPU.
- No NPU.
- Fabrication process: TSMC 4 nm FinFET.

Branding and model		CPU							GPU		Default TDP	Configurable TDP	Release date														
Branding and model		Cores (threads)			Clock (GHz)		L3 cache (total)	Core config (Note: Core Complexes (CCX) × cores per CCX or Zen 4 + Zen 4c cores)	Model	Clock (GHz)	Default TDP	Configurable TDP	Release date														
Branding and model		Total	Zen 4	Zen 4c	Base	Boost	L3 cache (total)	Core config	Model	Clock (GHz)	Default TDP	Configurable TDP	Release date														
Branding and model		Total	Zen 4	Zen 4c	Base	Boost	L3 cache (total)	Core config	Model	Clock (GHz)	Default TDP	Configurable TDP	Release date	Ryzen	Z1 Extreme	8 (16)	8 (16)	—N/a	3.3	5.1	16 MB	1 × 8	RDNA 3; 12 CU	2.9	28 W	9–30 W	May 2023
Z1	6 (12)	2 (4)	4 (8)	3.2 (average); 3.7 (Zen 4); 3 (Zen 4c)	4.9 (Zen 4); 3.5 (Zen 4c)	2 + 4	RDNA 3; 4 CU	2.8						Ryzen							16 MB				28 W	9–30 W	May 2023

=== Ryzen Z2 series (multiple architectures) ===
Branding and Model		Codename	Process	CPU							GPU			NPU (Ryzen AI)	Default TDP	Configurable TDP	Release date
Branding and Model		Codename	Process	Cores (threads)			Clock (GHz)		L3 cache (total)	Core config (Note: Core Complexes (CCX) × cores per CCX or Zen 5 + Zen 5c cores)	Architecture	Compute units	Clock (GHz)	NPU (Ryzen AI)	Default TDP	Configurable TDP	Release date
Branding and Model		Codename	Process	Total	Zen 2/3+/4/5	Zen 5c	Base	Boost	L3 cache (total)	Core config	Architecture	Compute units	Clock (GHz)	NPU (Ryzen AI)	Default TDP	Configurable TDP	Release date
Ryzen AI	Z2 Extreme	Strix Point	TSMC; 4 nm	8 (16)	3 (6) (Zen 5)	5 (10) (Zen 5c)	2.0	5.0 / 3.3	16 MB	3 + 5	RDNA3.5	16	2.9	50 TOPS	28 W	15–35 W	June 2025
Ryzen	Z2 Extreme	Strix Point	TSMC; 4 nm	8 (16)	3 (6) (Zen 5)	5 (10) (Zen 5c)	2.0	5.0 / 3.3	16 MB	3 + 5	RDNA3.5	16	2.9	—N/a	28 W	15–35 W	Q1 2025
Ryzen	Z2	Hawk Point	TSMC; 4 nm	8 (16)	8 (16) (Zen 4)	—N/a	3.3	5.1	16 MB	1 × 8	RDNA3	12	2.7	—N/a	28 W	15–30 W	Q1 2025
Ryzen	Z2 Go	Rembrandt+	TSMC; 6 nm	4 (8)	4 (8) (Zen 3+)	—N/a	3.0	4.3	8 MB	1 × 4	RDNA2	12	2.2	—N/a	28 W	15–30 W	Q1 2025
Ryzen	Z2 A	Van Gogh	TSMC; 7 nm	4 (8)	4 (8) (Zen 2)	—N/a	2.8	3.8	4 MB	1 × 4	RDNA2	8	1.8	—N/a	15 W	6–20 W	June 2025

== Embedded processors ==
=== 1000 series ===
==== Great Horned Owl (V1000 series, Zen/GCN5 based) ====
Model	Release date	Fab	CPU						GPU				Memory support	TDP	Junction temp. range (°C)
Model	Release date	Fab	Cores (threads)	Clock rate (GHz)		Cache			Model	Config (Note: Unified Shaders : Texture Mapping Units : Render Output Units and Compute Units (CU))	Clock (GHz)	Processing power (GFLOPS) (Note: Single-precision performance is calculated from the base (or boost) core clock speed based on a FMA operation.)	Memory support	TDP	Junction temp. range (°C)
Model	Release date	Fab	Cores (threads)	Base	Boost	L1	L2	L3	Model	Config	Clock (GHz)	Processing power (GFLOPS)	Memory support	TDP	Junction temp. range (°C)
V1202B	February 2018	GloFo; 14LP	2 (4)	2.3	3.2	64 KB inst. 32 KB data per core	512 KB per core	4 MB	Vega 3	192:12:16; 3 CU	1.0	384	DDR4-2400 dual-channel	12–25 W	0–105
V1404I	December 2018	GloFo; 14LP	4 (8)	2.0	3.6	64 KB inst. 32 KB data per core	512 KB per core	4 MB	Vega 8	512:32:16; 8 CU	1.1	1126.4	DDR4-2400 dual-channel	12–25 W	-40–105
V1500B	December 2018	GloFo; 14LP	4 (8)	2.2	—N/a	64 KB inst. 32 KB data per core	512 KB per core	4 MB	—N/a				DDR4-2400 dual-channel	12–25 W	0–105
V1605B	February 2018	GloFo; 14LP	4 (8)	2.0	3.6	64 KB inst. 32 KB data per core	512 KB per core	4 MB	Vega 8	512:32:16; 8 CU	1.1	1126.4	DDR4-2400 dual-channel	12–25 W	0–105
V1756B	February 2018	GloFo; 14LP	4 (8)	3.25	3.6	64 KB inst. 32 KB data per core	512 KB per core	4 MB	Vega 8	512:32:16; 8 CU	1.1	1126.4	DDR4-3200 dual-channel	35–54 W	0–105
V1780B	December 2018	GloFo; 14LP	4 (8)	3.35	3.6	64 KB inst. 32 KB data per core	512 KB per core	4 MB	—N/a				DDR4-3200 dual-channel	35–54 W	0–105
V1807B	February 2018	GloFo; 14LP	4 (8)	3.35	3.8	64 KB inst. 32 KB data per core	512 KB per core	4 MB	Vega 11	704:44:16; 11 CU	1.3	1830.4	DDR4-3200 dual-channel	35–54 W	0–105

==== Banded Kestrel (R1000 series, Zen/GCN5 based) ====
Model	Release date	Fab	CPU						GPU				Memory support	TDP
Model	Release date	Fab	Cores (threads)	Clock rate (GHz)		Cache			Model	Config (Note: Unified Shaders : Texture Mapping Units : Render Output Units and Compute Units (CU))	Clock (GHz)	Processing power (GFLOPS) (Note: Single-precision performance is calculated from the base (or boost) core clock speed based on a FMA operation.)	Memory support	TDP
Model	Release date	Fab	Cores (threads)	Base	Boost	L1	L2	L3	Model	Config	Clock (GHz)	Processing power (GFLOPS)	Memory support	TDP
R1102G	February 25, 2020	GloFo; 14LP	2 (2)	1.2	2.6	64 KB inst. 32 KB data per core	512 KB per core	4 MB	Vega 3	192:12:4; 3 CU	1.0	384	DDR4-2400 single-channel	6 W
R1305G	February 25, 2020	GloFo; 14LP	2 (4)	1.5	2.8	64 KB inst. 32 KB data per core	512 KB per core	4 MB	Vega 3	192:12:4; 3 CU	1.0	384	DDR4-2400 dual-channel	8-10 W
R1505G	April 16, 2019	GloFo; 14LP	2 (4)	2.4	3.3	64 KB inst. 32 KB data per core	512 KB per core	4 MB	Vega 3	192:12:4; 3 CU	1.0	384	DDR4-2400 dual-channel	12–25 W
R1606G	April 16, 2019	GloFo; 14LP	2 (4)	2.6	3.5	64 KB inst. 32 KB data per core	512 KB per core	4 MB	Vega 3	192:12:4; 3 CU	1.2	460.8	DDR4-2400 dual-channel	12–25 W

=== 2000 series ===
==== Grey Hawk (V2000 series, Zen 2/GCN5 based) ====
Model	Release date	Fab	CPU						GPU				Socket	PCIe support	Memory support	TDP
Model	Release date	Fab	Cores (threads)	Clock rate (GHz)		Cache			Archi- tecture	Config (Note: Unified Shaders : Texture Mapping Units : Render Output Units and Compute Units (CU))	Clock (GHz)	Processing power (Note: Single-precision performance is calculated from the base (or boost) core clock speed based on a FMA operation.) (GFLOPS)	Socket	PCIe support	Memory support	TDP
Model	Release date	Fab	Cores (threads)	Base	Boost	L1	L2	L3	Archi- tecture	Config	Clock (GHz)	Processing power (GFLOPS)	Socket	PCIe support	Memory support	TDP
V2516	Nov 10, 2020	TSMC; 7FF	6 (12)	2.1	3.95	32 KB inst. 32 KB data per core	512 KB per core	8 MB	GCN 5	384:24:8; 6 CU	1.5	1152	FP6	20 (8+4+4+4); PCIe 3.0	DDR4-3200 dual-channel LPDDR4X-4266 quad-channel	10–25 W
V2546	Nov 10, 2020	TSMC; 7FF	6 (12)	3.0	3.95	32 KB inst. 32 KB data per core	512 KB per core	8 MB	GCN 5	384:24:8; 6 CU	1.5	1152	FP6	20 (8+4+4+4); PCIe 3.0	DDR4-3200 dual-channel LPDDR4X-4266 quad-channel	35–54 W
V2A46	Jan 4, 2023	TSMC; 7FF	6 (12)	3.0	3.2	32 KB inst. 32 KB data per core	512 KB per core	8 MB	GCN 5	448:28:8; 7 CU	1.6	1433.6	FP6	20 (8+4+4+4); PCIe 3.0	DDR4-3200 dual-channel LPDDR4X-4266 quad-channel	35–54 W
V2718	Nov 10, 2020	TSMC; 7FF	8 (16)	1.7	4.15	32 KB inst. 32 KB data per core	512 KB per core	8 MB	GCN 5	448:28:8; 7 CU	1.6	1433.6	FP6	20 (8+4+4+4); PCIe 3.0	DDR4-3200 dual-channel LPDDR4X-4266 quad-channel	10–25 W
V2748	Nov 10, 2020	TSMC; 7FF	8 (16)	2.9	4.25	32 KB inst. 32 KB data per core	512 KB per core	8 MB	GCN 5	448:28:8; 7 CU	1.6	1433.6	FP6	20 (8+4+4+4); PCIe 3.0	DDR4-3200 dual-channel LPDDR4X-4266 quad-channel	35–54 W

==== River Hawk (R2000 series, Zen+ based) ====
Model	Release date	Fab	CPU						GPU				Socket	PCIe support	Memory support	TDP
Model	Release date	Fab	Cores (threads)	Clock rate (GHz)		Cache			Archi- tecture	Config (Note: Unified Shaders : Texture Mapping Units : Render Output Units and Compute Units (CU))	Clock (GHz)	Processing power (Note: Single-precision performance is calculated from the base (or boost) core clock speed based on a FMA operation.) (GFLOPS)	Socket	PCIe support	Memory support	TDP
Model	Release date	Fab	Cores (threads)	Base	Boost	L1	L2	L3	Archi- tecture	Config	Clock (GHz)	Processing power (GFLOPS)	Socket	PCIe support	Memory support	TDP
R2312	June 7, 2022	GloFo; 12LP	2 (4)	2.7	3.5	64 KB inst. 32 KB data per core	512 KB per core	4 MB	GCN 5	192:12:4; 3 CU	1.2	460.8	FP5	8 lanes Gen 3	DDR4-2400 dual-channel ECC	10–25 W
R2314	June 7, 2022	GloFo; 12LP	4 (4)	2.1	3.5	64 KB inst. 32 KB data per core	512 KB per core	4 MB	GCN 5	384:24:8; 6 CU	1.2	921.6	FP5	16 lanes Gen 3	DDR4-2666 dual-channel ECC	10–35 W

=== 3000 series ===
==== (V3000 series, Zen 3 based) ====
Model	Release date	Fab	CPU						Socket	PCIe support	Memory support	TDP
Model	Release date	Fab	Cores (threads)	Clock rate (GHz)		Cache			Socket	PCIe support	Memory support	TDP
Model	Release date	Fab	Cores (threads)	Base	Boost	L1	L2	L3	Socket	PCIe support	Memory support	TDP
V3C14	September 27, 2022	TSMC; 7FF	4 (8)	2.3	3.8	32 KB inst. 32 KB data per core	512 KB per core	8 MB	FP7r2	20 (8+4+4+4); PCIe 4.0	DDR5-4800 dual-channel	15 W
V3C44	September 27, 2022	TSMC; 7FF	4 (8)	3.5	3.8	32 KB inst. 32 KB data per core	512 KB per core	8 MB	FP7r2	20 (8+4+4+4); PCIe 4.0	DDR5-4800 dual-channel	45 W
V3C16	September 27, 2022	TSMC; 7FF	6 (12)	2.0	3.8	32 KB inst. 32 KB data per core	512 KB per core	16 MB	FP7r2	20 (8+4+4+4); PCIe 4.0	DDR5-4800 dual-channel	15 W
V3C18I	September 27, 2022	TSMC; 7FF	8 (16)	1.9	3.8	32 KB inst. 32 KB data per core	512 KB per core	16 MB	FP7r2	20 (8+4+4+4); PCIe 4.0	DDR5-4800 dual-channel	15 W
V3C48	September 27, 2022	TSMC; 7FF	8 (16)	3.3	3.8	32 KB inst. 32 KB data per core	512 KB per core	16 MB	FP7r2	20 (8+4+4+4); PCIe 4.0	DDR5-4800 dual-channel	45 W

=== 5000 series ===
==== (Ryzen Embedded 5000 series, Zen 3 based) ====
Common features of Ryzen Embedded 5000 series CPUs:

- Socket: AM4.
- All the CPUs support ECC DDR4-3200 dual-channel mode.
- L1 cache: 64 KB (32 KB data + 32 KB instruction) per core.
- L2 cache: 512 KB per core.
- No integrated graphics.
- All the CPUs support 24 PCIe 4.0 lanes. 4 of the lanes are reserved as link to the chipset.
- Fabrication process: TSMC 7FF.

Processor branding	Model	Cores (threads)	Clock rate (GHz)		L3 cache (total)	Chiplets	Core config (Note: Core Complexes (CCX) × cores per CCX)	TDP	Release date
Processor branding	Model	Cores (threads)	Base	Boost	L3 cache (total)	Chiplets	Core config	TDP	Release date
Ryzen Embedded	5950E	16 (32)	3.05	3.4	64 MB	2 × CCD; 1 × I/OD	2 × 8	105 W	Apr 20, 2023
Ryzen Embedded	5900E	12 (24)	3.35	3.7	64 MB	2 × CCD; 1 × I/OD	2 × 6	105 W	Apr 20, 2023
Ryzen Embedded	5800E	8 (16)	3.4	3.7	32 MB	1 × CCD; 1 × I/OD	1 × 8	65-100 W	Apr 20, 2023
Ryzen Embedded	5600E	6 (12)	3.3	3.6	32 MB	1 × CCD; 1 × I/OD	1 × 6	65 W	Apr 20, 2023

=== 7000 series ===
==== (Ryzen Embedded 7000 series, Zen 4/RDNA2 based) ====
Common features of Ryzen Embedded 7000 series CPUs:

- Socket: AM5.
- All the CPUs support ECC DDR5-5200 dual-channel mode.
- L1 cache: 64 KB (32 KB data + 32 KB instruction) per core.
- L2 cache: 1 MB per core.
- All the CPUs support 28 PCIe 5.0 lanes. 4 of the lanes are reserved as link to the chipset.
- Includes integrated RDNA 2 GPU with 2 CUs and boost clock speeds of 2200 MHz.
- Fabrication process: TSMC N5 FinFET (N6 FinFET for the I/O die).

Processor branding	Model	Cores (threads)	Clock rate (GHz)		L3 cache (total)	Chiplets	Core config (Note: Core Complexes (CCX) × cores per CCX)	TDP	Release date
Processor branding	Model	Cores (threads)	Base	Boost	L3 cache (total)	Chiplets	Core config	TDP	Release date
Ryzen Embedded	7945	12 (24)	3.7	5.4	64 MB	2 × CCD; 1 × I/OD	2 × 6	65 W	Nov 14, 2023
Ryzen Embedded	7745	8 (16)	3.8	5.3	32 MB	1 × CCD; 1 × I/OD	1 × 8	65 W	Nov 14, 2023
Ryzen Embedded	7700X	8 (16)	4.5	5.4	32 MB	1 × CCD; 1 × I/OD	1 × 8	105 W	Nov 14, 2023
Ryzen Embedded	7645	6 (12)	3.8	5.1	32 MB	1 × CCD; 1 × I/OD	1 × 6	65 W	Nov 14, 2023
Ryzen Embedded	7600X	6 (12)	4.7	5.3	32 MB	1 × CCD; 1 × I/OD	1 × 6	105 W	Nov 14, 2023

=== P100 series ===
==== (Ryzen AI Embedded P100 series, Zen 5/RDNA 3.5 based) ====
Model numbers with the "i" suffix are marketed for industrial use and support operating at colder ambient temperatures. Model numbers with the "a" suffix are marketed for automotive use and are AEC-Q100 qualified for reliability and longevity.

Common features of Ryzen AI Embedded P100 series CPUs:

- Socket: BGA, FP8 package type.
- L3 cache (total): 8 MB.
- All models support dual-channel ECC DRAM.
- All models support 14 PCIe 4.0 lanes.
- Native 10GbE ports (with TSN): 2
- Native USB 5Gbps (USB 3.2 Gen 1 operation mode): 1
- Native USB 5Gbps (USB 3.1 Gen 1 operation mode): 1
- Native USB 2.0 (480 Mbit/s): 4
- iGPU uses the RDNA 3.5 microarchitecture and supports output at up to 120 FPS to up to either 4 × 4K or 2 × 8K displays.
- iGPU supports encoding/decoding video at up to 4K & 60 Hz.
- All iGPUs support HDMI 2.1 and DisplayPort 2.0 output.
- NPU uses the XDNA 2 architecture.
- Rated longevity: "2.5 years (Standard), Up to 10 years (Extended)"

Processor branding	Model	CPU			GPU			Memory support	NPU TOPS	USB4 ports	Nominal TDP	Configurable TDP	Junction temperature range	Release date
Processor branding	Model	Cores (threads)	Boost clock (GHz)	L2 cache (total)	CU	Clock (GHz)	eDP version	Memory support	NPU TOPS	USB4 ports	Nominal TDP	Configurable TDP	Junction temperature range	Release date
Ryzen AI Embedded	P132i	6 (12)	4.5	6 MB	4	2.8	1.4	LPDDR5X-8000; DDR5-5600	50	2	28 W	15–54 W	−40 °C – 105 °C	Q2 2026
Ryzen AI Embedded	P132	6 (12)	4.5	6 MB	4	2.8	1.4	LPDDR5X-8000; DDR5-5600	50	2	28 W	15–54 W	0 °C – 105 °C	Q2 2026
Ryzen AI Embedded	P132a	6 (12)	3.7	4 MB	4	2.4	1.5	LPDDR5X-7500 with RAS	50	No	45 W	25–45 W	−40 °C – 105 °C	Q2 2026
Ryzen AI Embedded	P121i	4 (8)	4.4	4 MB	2	2.7	1.4	LPDDR5X-7500; DDR5-5600	30	2	28 W	15–54 W	−40 °C – 105 °C	Q2 2026
Ryzen AI Embedded	P121	4 (8)	4.4	4 MB	2	2.7	1.4	LPDDR5X-7500; DDR5-5600	30	2	28 W	15–54 W	0 °C – 105 °C	Q2 2026
Ryzen AI Embedded	P122a	4 (8)	3.7	4 MB	4	2.0	1.6	LPDDR5X-7500 with RAS	30	No	28 W	15–30 W	−40 °C – 105 °C	Q2 2026

== See also ==
- Table of AMD processors
- List of AMD Athlon processors
- List of AMD processors with 3D graphics
- List of AMD CPU microarchitectures
- List of AMD chipsets
