= Timeline of computing 1950–1979 =

This article presents a detailed timeline of events in the history of computing from 1950 to 1979. For narratives explaining the overall developments, see the history of computing.

== 1950s ==
Date	Place	Event
Feb 1950	Sweden	BARK was finished in Sweden. Next to come was BESK in 1953.
Apr 1950	US	SEAC (Standards Eastern Automatic Computer) demonstrated at US NBS in Washington, DC – was the first fully functional stored-program computer in the U.S. It was the first computer to do most of its logic with a solid-state device, the diode.
May 1950	UK	The Pilot ACE computer, with 800 vacuum tubes, and mercury delay lines for its main memory, became operational on 10 May 1950 at the National Physical Laboratory near London. It was a preliminary version of the full ACE, which had been designed by Alan Turing.
Aug 1950	US	SWAC (Standards Western Automatic Computer) demonstrated at UCLA in Los Angeles; fastest computer in the world until IAS machine.
Sep 1950	GER	Konrad Zuse leased his Z4 machine to the ETH Zurich for five years. Z4 was a relay-based machine. The corresponding contract was signed in the fall of 1949, and the machine reassembled in Zurich after its arrival in July 1950. The Z4 was replaced by ERMETH, a computer developed at the ETH in Switzerland from 1953 to 1956, one of the first electronic computers on the European continent.
Oct 1950	UK	Turing Test – The British mathematician and computer pioneer Alan Turing published a paper describing the potential development of human and computer intelligence and communication. The paper would come later to be called the Turing Test.
1950	US	TIME magazine cover story on the Harvard "Mark III: Can man build a superman?" includes a quote from Howard Aiken, commenting on "calculators" (computers) then under construction: "We'll have to think up bigger problems if we want to keep them busy."
30 Mar 1951	US	The first commercially successful electronic computer, UNIVAC, was also the first general-purpose computer – designed to handle both numeric and textual information. Designed by J. Presper Eckert and John Mauchly, whose corporation subsequently passed to Remington Rand. The implementation of this machine marked the real beginning of the computer era. Remington Rand delivered the first UNIVAC machine to the U.S. Bureau of Census. This machine used magnetic tape for input.
21 Apr 1951	US	Whirlwind, the first real-time computer was built at MIT by the team of Jay Forrester for the US Air Defense System, became operational. This computer is the first to allow interactive computing, allowing users to interact with it using a keyboard and a cathode-ray tube. The Whirlwind design was later developed into SAGE, a comprehensive system of real-time computers used for early warning of air attacks.
17 Nov 1951	UK	J. Lyons, a United Kingdom food company, famous for its tea, made history by running the first business application on an electronic computer. A payroll system was run on Lyons Electronic Office (LEO) a computer system designed by Maurice Wilkes who had previously worked on EDSAC.
Sep 1951	UK	The oldest known recordings of computer generated music were played by the Ferranti Mark 1 computer. The Mark 1 is a commercial version of the Manchester Mark 1 machine from the University of Manchester. The music program was written by Christopher Strachey.
1951	US	EDVAC (Electronic Discrete Variable Computer). The first computer to use magnetic tape. EDVAC could have new programs loaded from the tape. It was built by the Moore School of Electrical Engineering at the University of Pennsylvania, and delivered to the Ballistic Research Laboratory at Aberdeen Proving Ground.
1951	Australia	CSIRAC used to play music – the first time a computer was used as a musical instrument.
1951	US	The A-0 high-level compiler is invented by Grace Murray Hopper.
April 1952	US	IBM introduces the IBM 701, the first computer in its 700 and 7000 series of large scale machines with varied scientific and commercial architectures, but common electronics and peripherals. Some computers in this series remained in service until the 1980s.
June 1952	US	IAS machine completed at the Institute for Advanced Study, Princeton, US (by Von Neumann and others).
1952	France	Bull introduces the Gamma 3. A dual-mode decimal and binary computer that sold over 1200 units, becoming the first computer produced in over 1000 units.
1952	USSR	BESM-1 is completed. Only one BESM-1 machine was built. The machine used approximately 5,000 vacuum tubes.
1953	UK	The University of Manchester team complete the first transistorised computer.
1953	US	Arthur Andersen was hired to program the payroll for General Electric (GE)'s Appliance Park manufacturing facility near Louisville, Kentucky. As a result, GE purchased UNIVAC I which became the first-ever commercial computer in the US. Joe Glickauf was Arthur Andersen's project leader for the GE engagement.
1953	World	Estimate that there are 100 computers in the world.
1953	US	Magnetic-core memory developed.
1954	US	FORTRAN (FORmula TRANslation), the first high-level programming language development, was begun by John Backus and his team at IBM. The development continued until 1957. It is still in use for scientific programming. Before being run, a FORTRAN program needs to be converted into a machine program by a compiler, itself a program.
1954	US	The IBM 650 is introduced. A relatively inexpensive decimal machine with drum storage, it becomes the first computer produced over 2000 units.
December 1954	US	The NORC was delivered by IBM to the US Navy.
1955	US	Carl Frosch and Lincoln Derick discover surface passivation by silicon dioxide.
1956	US	First conference on artificial intelligence held at Dartmouth College in New Hampshire.
1956	US	The Bendix G-15 computer was introduced by the Bendix Corporation.
1956	NED	Edsger Dijkstra invented an efficient algorithm for shortest paths in graphs as a demonstration of the abilities of the ARMAC computer. The example used was the Dutch railway system. The problem was chosen because it could be explained quickly and the result checked. Dijkstra also made important contributions to many areas of computing – in particular on problems relating to concurrency, such as the invention of the semaphore.
1957	US	Frosch and Derick manufacture the first semiconductor oxide(SiO2) field effect transistors; the first planar transistors, in which drain and source were adjacent at the same surface.
1957	US	First dot matrix printer marketed by IBM.
1957	France	The Gamma 60 is announced by Bull, becoming the first computer featuring an architecture specially designed for parallelism.
1957	US	FORTRAN development finished. See 1954.
1957	US	I have travelled the length and breadth of this country and talked with the best people, and I can assure you that data processing is a fad that won't last out the year. — Editor in charge of business books for Prentice Hall
1958	US	Programming language LISP (interpreted) developed, Finished in 1960. LISP stands for 'LISt Processing'. Used in AI development. Developed by John McCarthy at Massachusetts Institute of Technology.
1958	USSR	Setun, a balanced ternary computer developed in 1958 at Moscow State University.
12 Sep 1958	US	The integrated circuit invented by Jack Kilby at Texas Instruments. Robert Noyce, who later set up Intel, also worked separately on the invention. Intel later went on to perfect the microprocessor. The patent was applied for in 1959 and granted in 1964. This patent was not accepted by Japan so Japanese businesses could avoid paying any fees, but in 1989 – after a 30-year legal battle – Japan granted the patent; so all Japanese companies paid fees up until the year 2001 – long after the patent became obsolete in the rest of the world.
1958–1964	World	Computers based on discrete transistors and printed circuits are regarded as second-generation computers which are typically smaller, more powerful and more reliable. Early examples include Philco Corporation Transac S-2000 (1958) and RCA 501 (1959).
1959	UK	Christopher Strachey, who became Oxford University's first professor of computation, filed a patent application for time-sharing. He passed the concept on to J. C. R. Licklider at a UNESCO-sponsored conference on Information Processing in Paris that year.
1959	US	COBOL (COmmon Business-Oriented Language) developed by Grace Murray Hopper as the successor to FLOW-MATIC, finished in 1961.
1959	USSR	Minsk mainframe computer development and production begun in the USSR. Stopped in 1975.
1959	US	Following Frosch and Derick research at Bell Labs, Mohamed Atalla and Dawon Kahng proposed a silicon MOS transistor in 1959.
1959	US	The silicon integrated circuit developed by Robert Noyce at Fairchild Semiconductor, using Jean Hoerni's planar process. In contrast to Kilby's germanium integrated circuit, Noyce developed a silicon integrated circuit, using Jean Hoerni's planar process.
1959	US	Douglas E. Eastwood and Douglas McIlroy of Bell Labs created Macro SAP, the first programming language with advanced macro capabilities. The following year McIlroy published a seminal paper in the fields of macro processors and programming language extensibility.

== 1960s ==
Date	Place	Event
1960	US	A working MOSFET is built by a team at Bell Labs. E. E. LaBate and E. I. Povilonis made the device; M. O. Thurston, L. A. D’Asaro, and J. R. Ligenza developed the diffusion processes, and H. K. Gummel and R. Lindner characterized the device.
1960	US; EUR	ALGOL, first structured, procedural, programming language to be released.
1960	UK	The first compiler-compiler is released.
1961	US	APL programming language released by Kenneth Iverson at IBM.
1961	US	The AN/UYK-1 (TRW-130) computer was designed with rounded edges to fit through the hatch of ballistic missile submarines, as part of the first satellite navigation system, Transit.
1961	US	The Molecular Electronic Computer, the first integrated circuits general-purpose computer (built for demonstration purposes, programmed to simulate a desk calculator), was built by Texas Instruments for the US Air Force.
1962	UK	ATLAS is completed by the University of Manchester team. This machine introduced many modern architectural concepts: spooling, interrupts, pipelining, interleaved memory, virtual memory and paging. It was the most powerful machine in the world at the time of release.
1962	US	Work begun on the LINC, the brainchild of the MIT physicist Wesley A. Clark in May 1961. It was the first functional prototype of a computer scaled down to be optimized and priced for the individual user (about $43,600 – equivalent to $464,100 in 2025). Used for the first time at the National Institutes of Mental Health in Bethesda, Maryland in 1963. Many consider it to be the first personal computer, despite the big dimension of some elements, e.g. the memory rack.
1962	US	Spacewar!, an early and highly influential computer game, is written by MIT student Steve Russell. The game ran on a DEC PDP-1. Competing players fired at each other's space ships using an early version of a joystick.
1963	US	Mouse conceived by Douglas Engelbart. The mouse was not to become popular until 1983 with Apple Computer's Lisa and Macintosh and not adopted by IBM until 1987 – although compatible computers such as the Amstrad PC1512 were fitted with mice before this date.
1964	US	Paul Baran proposes a method for using low-cost electronics (without software switches) for digital communication of voice messages. Baran published a series of briefings and papers about dividing information into "message blocks" and sending it over distributed networks between 1960 and 1964.
1964	US	Computers built between 1964 and 1972 are often regarded as third-generation computers; they are based on the first integrated circuits – creating even smaller machines. Typical of such machines were the HP 2116A and Data General Nova.
1964	US	Programming language PL/I released by IBM.
1964	US	Launch of IBM System/360 – the first series of compatible computers, reversing and stopping the evolution of separate "business" and "scientific" machine architectures; all models used the same basic instruction set architecture and register sizes, in theory allowing programs to be migrated to more or less powerful models as needs changed. The basic unit of memory, the "byte", was defined as 8 bits, with larger units such as "words" defined with sizes that were multiples of 8 bits, with many consequences. Many competing computers at the time used word sizes that were multiples of 6 bits. The marketing term "IBM Compatible" was often used, at this time, to indicate that the architecture used 8-bit bytes. Over 14,000 were shipped by 1968.
1964	US	Project MAC begun at MIT by J.C.R. Licklider: several terminals all across campus will be connected to a central computer, using a timesharing mechanism. Bulletin boards and email are popular applications.
1964	US	Sabre launched.
1965	US	DEC PDP-8 Mini Computer was released. It was the first minicomputer, built by Digital Equipment Corporation (DEC). It cost US$18,500 (equivalent to about $189,000 in 2025).
1965	US	Moore's law published by Gordon Moore. Originally suggesting integrated circuit complexity doubled every year. It was published in the 35th Anniversary edition of Electronics magazine. The law was revised in 1975 to suggest a doubling in complexity every two years.
1965	US	Fuzzy logic designed by Lotfi Zadeh (University of California, Berkeley), it is used to process approximate data – such as 'about 100'.
1965	US	Programming language BASIC (Beginners All Purpose Symbolic Instruction Code) developed at Dartmouth College, US, by Thomas E. Kurtz and John George Kemeny. This was the first language designed to be used in a time-sharing environment, such as DTSS (Dartmouth Time-Sharing System), or GCOS. BASIC was implemented on microcomputers in 1975.
1965	UK	Donald Davies independently invents packet switching used in modern computer networking. Davies conceived of and named the concept for data communication in 1965 and 1966. Many packet-switched networks built in the 1970s, including the ARPANET, were similar "in nearly all respects" to his original 1965 design.
1965	US	The first supercomputer, the Control Data CDC 6600, was developed.
1966	US	Hewlett-Packard entered the general-purpose computer business with its HP-2116A for computation, offering power formerly found only in much larger computers. It supported a wide variety of languages, among them ALGOL, BASIC, and FORTRAN.
1967	US/CH	Development of programming language Pascal begun, continued in Switzerland from 1968 to 1971. Based on ALGOL. Developed by Niklaus Wirth as a pedagogic tool.
1967	US	The floppy disk is invented at IBM under the direction of Alan Shugart, for use as a microprogram load device for the System/370 and peripheral controllers.
Aug 1967	UK	Wireless World magazine's low cost Digital Computer published in 5 parts. 8-Bit serial design demonstrator using germanium transistors.
1968	US	Intel founded by Robert Noyce and a few friends.
1968	US	Programming language LOGO developed by Wally Feurzeig, Seymour Papert, and Cynthia Solomon at MIT.
1968	US	Release of Hewlett-Packard 9100A, the programmable calculator (first scientific calculator) from HP.
1968	US	But what ... is it good for? — Engineer at the Advanced Computing Systems Division of IBM commenting on the microchip.
2 Oct 1968	GER	First computer ball mouse offered by Telefunken. The device named Rollkugel RKS 100-86 is based on "reversing" an earlier trackball-like device (also named Rollkugel) embedded into radar flight control desks, which had been developed around 1965 by a team led by Rainer Mallebrein at Telefunken Konstanz for the German Bundesanstalt für Flugsicherung as part of their TR 86 process computer system with its SIG 100-86 vector graphics terminal.
9 Dec 1968	US	Douglas Engelbart demonstrates interactive computing at the Fall Joint Computer Conference in San Francisco: mouse, on-screen windows, hypertext and full-screen word processing.
1969	US	The NPL network was the first network to implement packet switching in early 1969. The ARPANET, funded by the United States Department of Defense for research into computer resource sharing, connected two packet switches (Interface Message Processors) on November 21, 1969, between Stanford and UCLA. It was opened to non-military users later in the 1970s including many universities.
1969	US	Development of UNIX operating system begun. It was later released as C source code to aid portability, and subsequently versions are obtainable for many different computers, including the IBM PC. It and its clones (such as Linux) are still widely used on network servers and scientific workstations. Originally developed by Ken Thompson and Dennis Ritchie.
7 Apr 1969	US	The first Request for Comments, RFC 1 was published by Steve Crocker. The RFCs (network working group, Request For Comment) are a series of papers which are used to develop and define protocols for networking; originally the basis for ARPANET, there are now thousands of them applying to all aspects of the Internet. Collectively they document everything about the way the Internet and computers on it should behave, such as TCP/IP networking or how email headers should be written.
1969	?	Introduction of the RS-232 (serial interface) standard by EIA (Electronic Industries Association), one of the oldest serial interfaces still (uncommonly) in use today.
1969	US	Data General shipped a total of 50,000 Novas at US$8,000 each. The Nova was one of the first 16-bit minicomputers. It was first to employ medium-scale integration (MSI) circuits from Fairchild Semiconductor, with subsequent models using large-scale integrated (LSI) circuits. Also notable was that the entire central processor was contained on one 15-inch printed circuit board.

== 1970s ==
Date	Place	Event
Oct 1970	US	First dynamic RAM chip introduced by Intel. It was called the 1103 and had a capacity of 1 Kbit, 1024 bits.
1970	US	Programming language Forth developed. A simple, clean, stack-based design, which later inspired PostScript and the Java virtual machine.
1971	US	CTC ships the Datapoint 2200, a mass-produced programmable terminal. Its multi-chip CPU provided the basis for the Intel 8008. A monitor and cassette drives were built-in, and the entire system fit the approximate footprint of an IBM Selectric typewriter. Users quickly began to use the system as a standalone computer – one of the earliest to arguably qualify as a personal computer.
1971	US	Release of HP 9800 series, a series of desktop computers from Hewlett-Packard, replacing their first model, the Hewlett-Packard 9100A.
1971	US	Kenbak-1 ships. This small, cheap (US$750) personal computer, built using pre-microprocessor TTL technology, is one clear candidate for "first personal computer", and is so considered by the Computer History Museum and the American Computer Museum.
1971	US	Ray Tomlinson develops the first program that can send email messages, via the Arpanet, between people using different computers. (Programs existed previously that could send such messages between users logging onto the same computer.)
15 Nov 1971	US	The Intel 4004, the first commercially available microprocessor, is released. It contains the equivalent of 2,300 transistors and was a 4-bit processor. It is capable of around 60,000 instructions per second (0.06 MIPS), running at a maximum clock speed of 740 kHz.
1971		8-inch floppy disk introduced.
1972	US	Texas Instruments releases its first single-chip electronic calculator, the TI-2500 Datamath.
1972	US	Atari founded by Nolan Bushnell and Ted Dabney.
1972	US	Pong released – widely recognised as the first popular arcade video game. It was invented by Allan Alcorn.
1972	?	Computers built after 1972 are often called fourth-generation computers, based on LSI (Large Scale Integration) of circuits (such as microprocessors) – typically 500 or more components on a chip. Later developments include VLSI (Very Large Scale Integration) of integrated circuits 5 years later – typically 10,000 components. The fourth generation is generally viewed as running right up until the present, since although computing power has increased the basic technology has remained virtually the same.
1972	US	Programming language C developed at The Bell Laboratories in the US. Dennis Ritchie, one of the inventors of the Unix operating system, simplifies BCPL into a language he calls B, then iterates B into C. It is a very popular language, especially for systems programming – as it is flexible and fast. C was considered a refreshing change in the computing field because it helped introduce structured programming. Inspired by C, C++, was introduced in the 1980s, and in turn helped usher in the era of object-oriented programming.
1972	US	Hewlett-Packard releases the HP-35, the first handheld scientific calculator. This makes the engineer's slide rule obsolete.
1 Apr 1972	US	The first commercial 8-bit microprocessor, the 8008, is released by Intel.
1972	NOR	Norsk Data launches the Nord-5, the first 32-bit supermini computer.
1972	US	In 1972–1973, IBM Los Gatos Scientific Center developed a portable computer prototype called SCAMP (Special Computer APL Machine Portable) based on the IBM PALM processor with a Philips compact cassette drive, small CRT and full function keyboard. SCAMP emulated an IBM 1130 minicomputer in order to run APL\1130. Because it was the first to emulate APL\1130 performance on a portable, single-user computer, PC Magazine in 1983 designated SCAMP a "revolutionary concept" and "the world's first personal computer". The prototype is in the Smithsonian Institution.
1973	UK	Clifford Cocks invents a public-key cryptography algorithm equivalent to what would become (in 1978) the RSA algorithm while working at the Government Communications Headquarters (GCHQ).
1973	US	Xerox Alto, a powerful personal computer with bitmapped graphical user interface, deployed at Xerox Palo Alto Research Center.
1973	FRA	Microcomputer Micral N, developed in 1973 by Frenchman François Gernelle, of the company R2E. it will be officially recognized as "the first microcomputer marketed in the world" by Steve Wozniak (the designer of the Apple 1) who was in 1986 a member of the jury of an international competition in the United States.
1973	US	University College London's interconnection of the U.S. ARPANET and British academic networks establishes the first international heterogenous computer network.
1973	US	Development of the Transmission Control Program began by a group led by Vinton Cerf and Robert E. Kahn. Its eventual evolution into a protocol suite for internetworking enabled a network-of-networks to form the Internet.
1973	FRA	Programming language Prolog developed at the University of Luminy-Marseilles in France by Alain Colmerauer. It introduced the new paradigm of logical programming and is often used for expert systems and AI programming.
1973	US	The TV Typewriter, designed by Don Lancaster, displayed alphanumeric information on an ordinary television set. It used US$120 worth of electronics components. The original design included two memory boards and could generate and store 512 characters as 16 lines of 32 characters. A 90-minute cassette tape provided supplementary storage for about 100 pages of text.
1973	US	Ethernet developed. This became a popular way of connecting PCs and other computers together – to enable them to share data, and devices such as printers. A group of machines connected together in this way is known as a LAN.
1974	UK	Clip 4, the first computer with a parallel image-processing architecture, is implemented with 9,216 processors.
1974	CAN	The MCM/70, a candidate for first personal computer, is released by Micro Computer Machines of Canada. It failed commercially, despite weighing just 20 pounds and featuring a plasma display and a ROM-based APL programming language interpreter.
1 Apr 1974	US	Introduction of the Intel 8080. It ran at a clock frequency of 2 MHz and did 0.64 MIPS.
1974	US	Motorola announces the MC6800 8-bit microprocessor. It is easier to implement than the 8080 because it only needs a single power supply to operate and does not need support chips. Unlike the 8080 it is sold not as much as a general-purpose "number cruncher / computer" CPU but more as a control processor for industrial control and as a peripheral processor.
1974	US	Engineers Chuck Peddle and Bill Mensch leave Motorola after completing work on the 6800 CPU and join MOS Technology.
9 Oct 1974	UK	ICL launches its New Range of mainframes, the ICL 2900 Series.
1974	US	The MITS Altair 8800, the first commercially successful hobby computer, is released. An article in Popular Electronics (January 1975), described the computer and invited people to order kits. Despite the limited processing power, input/output system (blinkenlights and toggle switches) and memory (256 bytes), around 200 were ordered on the first day. 10,000 units were eventually shipped at a kit price of US$397 each. Numerous companies produced clones based on the "S-100 bus" (the Altair's main bus).
1975	Italy	Olivetti released the personal computer Olivetti P6060, the first with an integrated floppy disk drive. It was designed by Pier Giorgio Perotto.
1975	US	First microcomputer implementation of BASIC by Bill Gates and Paul Allen. It was written for the MITS Altair. This led to the formation of Microsoft later in the year.
1975	US	Unix marketed (see 1969).
1975	NOR	Norwegian company Mycron releases its MYCRO-1, the first single-board computer.
1975	US	Formation of Microsoft by Bill Gates and Paul Allen.
1975	US	MOS Technology releases their 6501 CPU. which is pin-compatible with Motorola's 6800, who soon starts a lawsuit against them. The 6501 is quickly withdrawn from sale and replaced with the 6502 which has a "lawsuit-compatible" (Note: See 6502 microprocessor history) design, but is otherwise nearly identical to the 6501. The 6502 becomes one of the most popular CPUs for the next 10 years and is used in many computers and game consoles (most notably the Atari 2600, Apple II, Commodore PET, VIC-20, Commodore 64, BBC Micro, and Nintendo Entertainment System).
1975	US	IBM 5100 computer released; with integrated keyboard, display, and mass storage on tape, it resembles the personal computers of a few years later, although it does not use a microprocessor.
1975	Italy	The laboratory CSELT released MUSA (MUltichannel Speaking Automaton), an early experiment of Speech Synthesis. It was able to read and sing Italian with multiple voices (a cappella).
Nov 1975	US	Zilog is founded by ex-Intel employees.
1 Apr 1976	US	Apple Computer, Inc. founded, to market the Apple I single-board computer designed by Steve Wozniak and Steve Jobs. It uses the MOS Technology 6502 microprocessor.
1976	US	First laser printer introduced by IBM – the IBM 3800. The first colour versions came onto the market in 1988.
1976	US	Introduction of the Intel 8085 chip. An improved version of the 8080, with a modest superset of the 8080s instruction set consisting of only two new documented instructions. Single 5V power supply (while the 8080 needed three different voltages).
1976	US	Z80 chip released by Zilog. It was a superset of the 8080 chip with additional registers and instructions, and using only one power supply voltage. CP/M was originally written for the 8080, but many implementations used the Z80. The Z80 was the processor for home computers like the Tandy TRS-80 of 1977, the Sinclair ZX Spectrum of 1982 and many others.
1976	US	MOS Technology introduces the KIM-1 microcomputer system as a demonstrator for its 6502 CPU.
1976	US	Cray-1 supercomputer was invented by Seymour Cray. He left Control Data in 1972 to form his own company. This machine was known as much for its horseshoe-shaped design as it was for being the first supercomputer to make vector processing practical. 85 were shipped at a cost of US$5 million each.
1976	US	Commodore buys MOS Technology in a stock trade. MOS is valued at US$12 million. Chuck Peddle joins Commodore as chief engineer. With the purchase of MOS, Commodore begins work on the Commodore PET.
1976	US	Emacs text editing software created.
1976		"5.25 inch floppy disks are introduced. When this product reaches the PC market it causes an explosive growth in digital information storage."
1977	US	Commodore introduces the Commodore PET. It comes with 4 KB or 8 KB of RAM, and an integrated cassette deck and 9" monochrome monitor.
1977	US	There is no reason anyone would want a computer in their home. — Ken Olsen, founder, president, and chairman of Digital Equipment Corporation
5 Jun 1977	US	Apple II computer introduced based on an 8-bit MOS Technology 6502 microprocessor running at 1 MHz with 4 KB of RAM. It had an open architecture, used color graphics, and an audio cassette interface for loading programs and storing data. Later, in July 1978, a floppy disk drive was made available with an elegantly designed interface. One of the first examples of a "killer app" (for the business world) was released for it – the VisiCalc spreadsheet program – in 1979.
Aug 1977	US	Tandy brought out the TRS-80 with "Level I BASIC". Despite simple black-and-white graphics, thanks to the nationwide chain of Radio Shack stores, it became a bestseller quickly.
Sep 1977	US	Heathkit made the H8 Home computer kit available. It was based on an Intel 8080A processor and shipped with HDOS (Heathkit Disk Operating System) and Benton Harbor BASIC.
1978	US	Tandy upgraded the TRS-80 with a much improved Microsoft 8K "Level II BASIC", and an "expansion interface" which added 32 KB RAM, A floppy disk and a printer interface. With these extras the TRS-80 became a viable small business computer.
Jun 1978	US	Introduction of the Speak & Spell educational toy by Texas Instruments. It consisted of a linear predictive coding speech synthesizer, a keyboard, and an alphanumeric vacuum fluorescent display. It had a vocabulary of 200 words stored in its internal 32K byte ROM.
8 Jun 1978	US	Introduction of the 16-bit Intel 8086, the first x86 microprocessor. The available clock frequencies were 5, 8 and 10 MHz, with an instruction set of about 300 operations. At its introduction, the fastest 8086 available was the 8 MHz version which achieved 0.8 MIPS and contained 29,000 transistors. Over three decades later, x86 remains the most popular and commercially successful instruction set architecture in the history of personal computing.
1978	JAP	The arcade video game Space Invaders is released, sparking a video game craze. In 1979, Atari's Asteroids would prove to be incredibly popular.
1979	US	Programming language Ada introduced by Jean Ichbiah and team at Honeywell for the US Department of Defense.
1 Jun 1979	US	Introduction of the Intel 8088, compatible with the 8086 with an 8-bit data bus – but this makes it cheaper to implement in computers. Chosen for the IBM PC, Intel processors were found in millions of IBM PC compatible computers.
1979	UK	Commodore PET released in the United Kingdom. Based on a 1 MHz 6502 processor it displayed monochrome text and had 8 KB of RAM. Priced £569. A version with 16 KB of RAM cost £776, while 32 KB of RAM cost £914.
1979	NED; JAP	Compact disc was invented.
1979	US	The Motorola 68000 Microprocessor launched, the first of the 68k family. 5+ years later it was used in machines such as the Macintosh, the Atari ST and the Amiga.
1979	US	Shortly after the release of V7 Unix, which included UUCP, a protocol for communication over standard telephone lines, Tom Truscott and Jim Ellis developed and released Usenet, a global discussion group system. Now, it uses Internet protocols and is still popular.
1979	US	Four disgruntled Atari programmers leave and form Activision, the first third-party video game software publisher. Activision promotes both the game and the programmer, changing the way software is marketed.
1979	US	Texas Instruments releases the 16-bit TI-99/4 microcomputer. This system generally used audio cassettes to store information, along with ROM modules, similar to gaming units, to hold commercial software. Additionally, TI made available a speech synthesizer, based on their own chip, for the TI-99/4 and its successor, the 4A.
1979	US	VisiCalc spreadsheet software released.
1979	US	WordStar word processing software released.
Nov 1979	US	Atari releases the Atari 400/800, high-performance game-oriented home computers based on the 6502 microprocessor.

== See also ==
- Information revolution
