= ECX =

ECX may refer to:

- European Climate Exchange
- Ethiopia Commodity Exchange
- Embedded Compact Extended, a small form factor Single Board Computer specification
- ECX register, an x86 general purpose register that is used by the CPU to store the loop counter
- ECX screwdriver
