= UConsole =

Modular handheld computer

uConsole
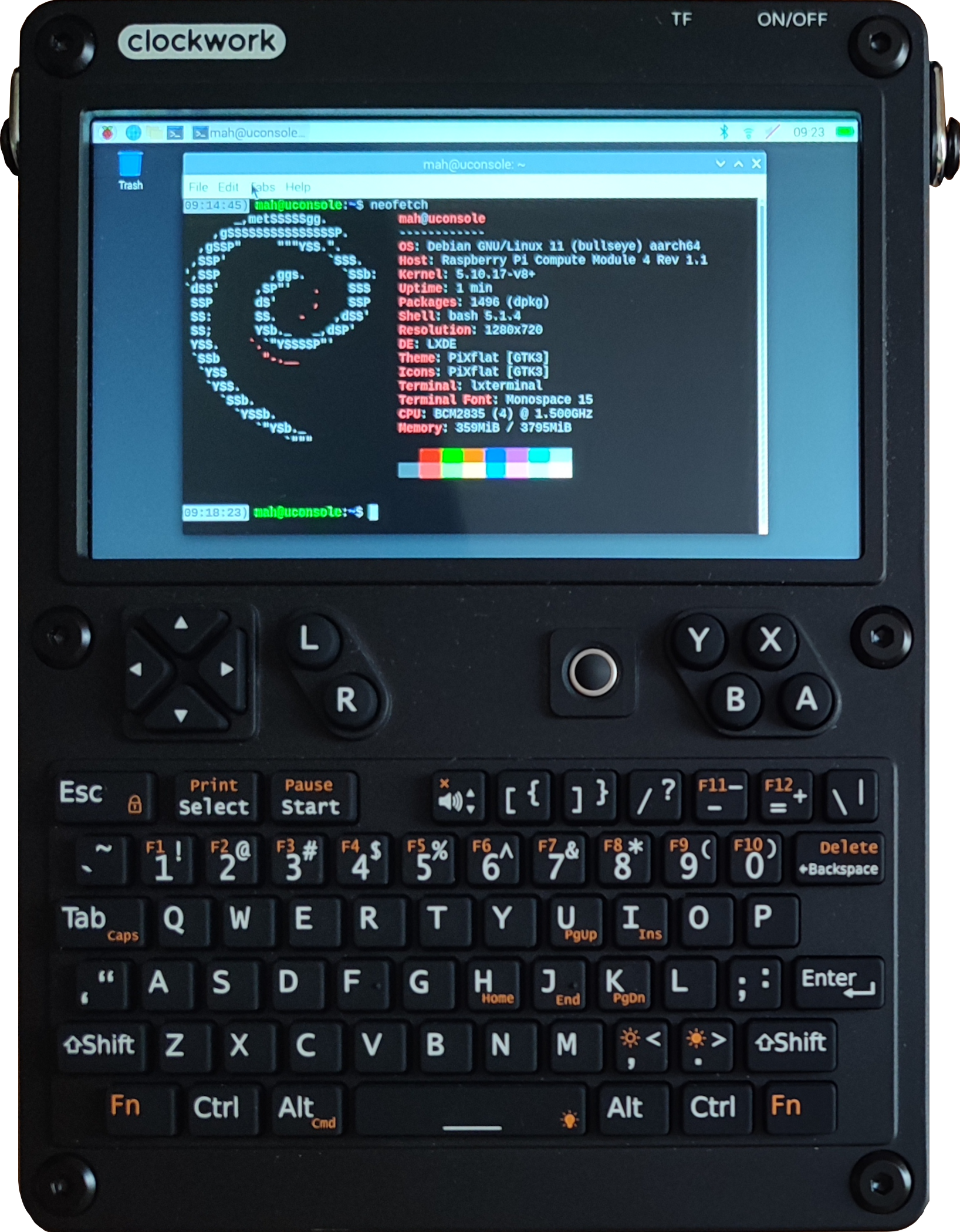
- The black variant of the uConsole
- Manufacturer: ClockworkPi
- Type: Handheld computer
- Display: 720p 5.0-inch IPS screen (w/ micro-HDMI output)
- Sound: 3.5mm audio jack; Internal stereo speaker
- Input: Thumb keyboard w/ 74 SMD Dome switches (QWERTY, arrow pad, gamepad); Mini trackball
- Connectivity: 802.11ac WiFi; Bluetooth 5.0; 1x MicroSD card slot; 1x USB 2.0 port; 2x internal USB 2.0 interface; 40-Pin GPIO (FPC); 52-pin Mini PCI-E; 200-pin DDR2-SODIMM (for compute module)
- Power: 2x 18650 batteries; 1x USB-C for charging (no data transfer)
- Dimensions: 170 mm (6.7 in) H 130 mm (5.1 in) W 26 mm (1.0 in) D

uConsole is a modular handheld computer made by ClockworkPi, designed as an enclosure for compute modules such as the Raspberry Pi. It is sold as a kit and aimed at computer hobbyists, intended to be easily adapted and modified, following the concepts of open-design and modularity.

The uConsole was announced in October 2022, and began shipping in July 2023. It originally supported the Raspberry Pi CM4, but ClockworkPi also offered three alternative modules for the carrier board: the A-04 and A-06, which have different configurations based on the Armv8-A architecture, and the R-01, based on RISC-V.

== Hardware and design ==
The uConsole was created with the open-design philosophy. The case is available as a 3D model, released under the GPL v3 license, and can be downloaded and recreated for free (such as with a 3D printer).

The case is made from metal. The front plate comes in black or silver, however the back of the device is silver on both variants, with a metal stand attachment to elevate the device when it is on a flat surface. Inside, the components are modular, with a ClockworkPi mainboard which takes a compute module (or the CM4 adapter to attach a Raspberry Pi CM4). There is an additional module for two rechargeable 18650 batteries which power the device, and a single USB-C port which is used to charge but has no data transfer. On the top right, there is space for a single extension board into the mainboard using a 52-pin Mini PCI-E slot, and the case also has space for the stereo speaker. The device works with Bluetooth 5.0 and dual-band 802.11ac WiFi, however ClockworkPi also sells an official 4G extension with SIM card slot for mobile and cellular connectivity.

The keyboard and screen are kept separate, secured underneath the front panel. The screen is a 5-inch IPS display with a 1280 × 720 resolution with output via micro-HDMI, and the keyboard has 74 keys with a backlight (including gamepad-style keys) which use Dome switches. In addition, there is a mini trackball for control.

=== Compute modules ===
The uConsole requires a "core module" to operate, which attaches to the mainboard via a 200-pin DDR2-SODIMM slot to provide CPU, memory, and GPU capabilities at a minimum. It officially supports the Raspberry Pi CM4 which is attached with an additional extension board, as well as three custom modules developed by ClockworkPi which are based on the Armv8-A and RISC-V architectures. The uConsole kits come in several variants, with or without a core module and 4G extension.

ClockworkPi modules
Model	Specs	Notes
Core A-04	ARM Cortex-A53 (quad core), Mali-T720 GPU, 2GB DDR3 RAM	Limited availability; most A-04 uConsole orders were upgraded to A-06
Core A-06	ARM Cortex-A72 (dual core), ARM Cortex-A53 (quad core), Mali-T864 GPU (Rockchip RK3399), 4GB DDR4 RAM	
Core R-01	64-bit RISC-V processor (RV64IMAFDCVU), 1GB DDR3 RAM	No GPU, experimental. Unavailable since early 2025.

==== Unofficial support ====
The uConsole unofficially supports other compute modules with varying degrees of success. As of 2025, the Raspberry Pi CM5 is virtually fully functional when used with community-made software patches. Similarly, the Raspberry Pi CM3 board is mostly supported through community patches, and it is also possible to run the Radxa CM5 with limited functionality.

== Use cases ==
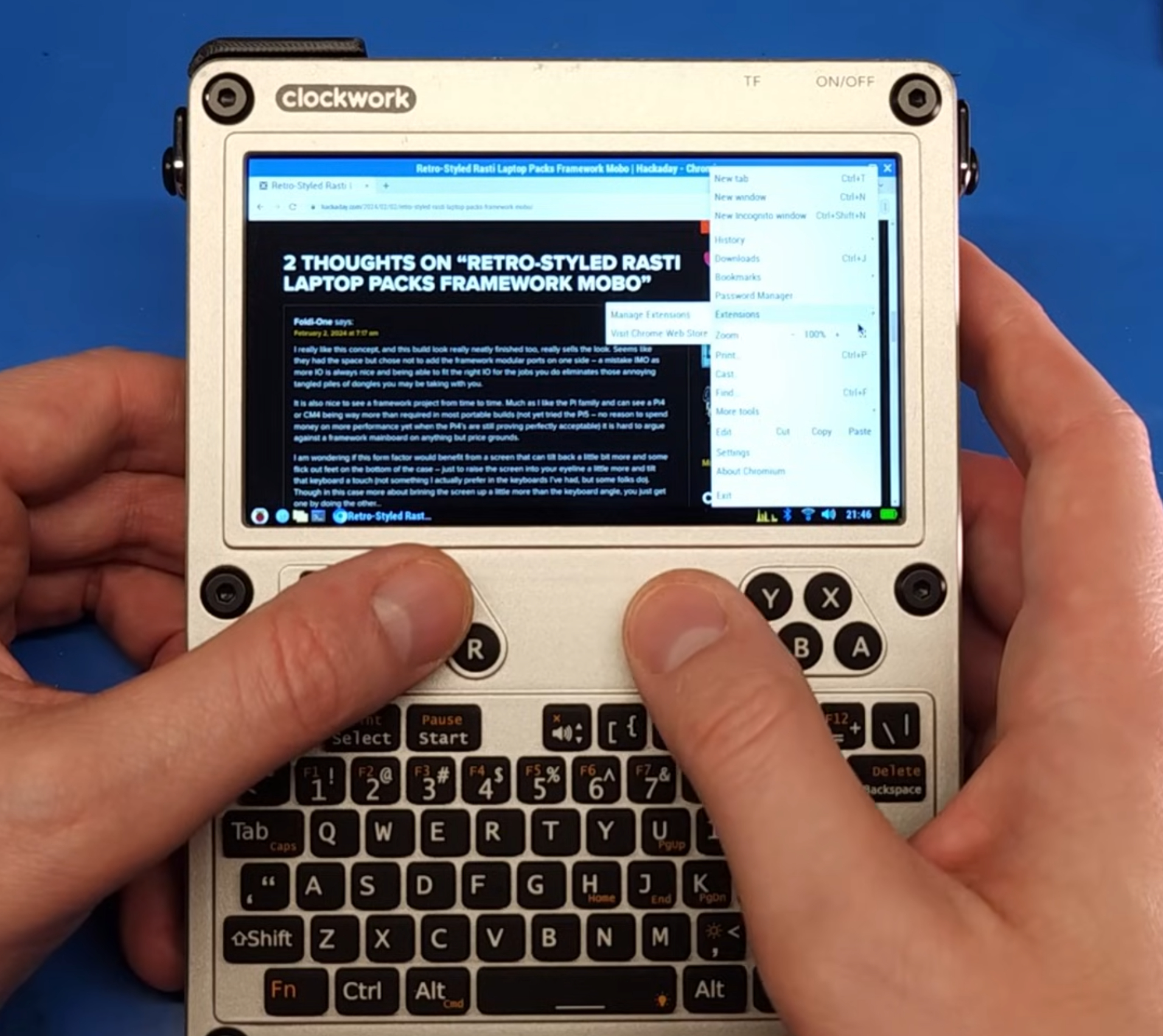
A silver uConsole being used to browse the web

The uConsole is intended to be used as a handheld computer running a full version of Linux. It is marketed as a portable programming device for field work and portable programming, including indie game development. Because it can be adapted and modified, including via the expansion board, the uConsole is used and modified by technology and electronic engineering hobbyists for various purposes, including RTL-SDR and LoRa extensions, and as a terminal emulator. It has also been used in the creative community as a controller in music production, as well as a retro game emulator.

Because the ClockworkPi offers a 4G/LTE extension providing cellular connectivity and mobile data, the uConsole has been compared to a PDA, particularly devices like Gemini PDA. It has also been described as an "off the shelf" cyberdeck.

== Availability ==
The uConsole was announced in October 2022, however orders didn't begin shipping until July 2023. It is produced for ClockworkPi by a manufacturer in China through a batch production process, a method which has been criticised for causing long delays and stock issues. In 2022, orders for the A-04 variant were upgraded to an A-06 due to limited availability of modules. Since its release, orders for the uConsole have typically taken in excess of 90 days to ship, in some case taking upwards of several months between order date and fulfillment.
