= Marshall Bennett =

American real estate developer (c.1915–2018)

- Born: c. 1915; Chicago, Illinois
- Died: October 13, 2018 (age 97); Chicago, Illinois
- Spouse: Arlene Gettelman
- Children: 2

Marshall Bennett (c. 1915 – October 13, 2018) was an American real estate developer who is credited with developing the modern industrial park.

== Biography ==
Bennett was born to a Jewish family in Chicago and raised in the South Shore neighborhood. He served in the U.S. Navy during World War II and was a graduate of the University of Chicago. After the war, he began working with Louis S. Kahnweiler and A. Jules Milten, becoming a partner at Kahnweiler's firm after Milten's departure. Their partnership would later dissolve in 1982. In the 1950s, Bennett, Kahnweiler and Jay Pritzker partnered to develop the Centex Industrial Park in Elk Grove Village. He subsequently developed an additional 25 industrial parks throughout the United States.

Bennett served on the board of the EastWest Institute, and co-founded the Chicago Ten which brought Jewish, Christian, and Muslim leaders together promote economic-based solutions for peace in the Middle East. In 2002, he founded the Marshall Bennett Institute of Real Estate at Roosevelt University offers master's and undergraduate degrees. Bennet hosted the "Marshall Bennett Classic" at his home in Sun Valley, Idaho, which brought together the top 100 real estate developers across the United States.

== Personal life ==
In 1948, he married Arlene Gettelman; they had two children: Alice Bennett Groh and Bija Bennett. In 1976, Bennett suffered a head injury during a kayaking accident that placed him in a coma, after which he had to relearn how to walk. He died on October 13, 2018, at his home in the Gold Coast neighborhood of Chicago. Services were held at Congregation Solel in Highland Park, Illinois.
