= Maxine Powell =

American etiquette instructor and talent agent

- Born: Maxine Blair; May 30, 1915; Texarkana, Texas, United States
- Died: October 14, 2013 (aged 98); Southfield, Michigan, United States
- Occupation(s): Etiquette instructor, talent agent
- Known for: Instructing Motown artists

Maxine Powell (May 30, 1915 – October 14, 2013) was an American etiquette instructor and talent agent. She taught grooming, poise, and social graces to many recording artists at Motown in the 1960s.

== Biography ==
Born Maxine Blair in Texarkana, Texas, she was raised by her aunt in Chicago, Illinois. She graduated from Hyde Park High School in 1933, attended Madam C.J. Walker's School of Beauty Culture, and worked as a manicurist to finance her acting studies; she also studied elocution and dance. In the early 1940s she worked as a model and as a personal maid, and she developed a one-woman show, An Evening with Maxine Powell, which she performed with a group at the Chicago Theatre.

She moved to Detroit, Michigan, in 1945 and taught self-improvement and modeling classes before opening the Maxine Powell Finishing and Modeling School in 1951. She bought a large house in 1953, which became the largest banquet facility in Detroit for African Americans, and worked as a talent agent, bringing black productions and artists to Detroit theaters and placing black models in advertising campaigns. Around this time she hired a printing business to prepare programs for her annual Las Vegas–style fashion show. The business was operated by the family of Berry Gordy. She and Gordy became friends, and in the early 1960s he asked her opinion of the young artists that had signed with his record company, Motown.

In 1964, she closed her school to be a consultant to Motown's talent. When Motown expanded into new offices in 1966, she was hired to work in the company's department of artist personal development, teaching artists such as Smokey Robinson and the Miracles, Marvin Gaye, the Jackson 5 and the Supremes, whose Mary Wilson stated Powell taught them more than stage presence, but "tools for us as human beings". In Powell's words, she turned them into performers "fit for kings and queens." While at Motown, Powell also worked as the costumer for the Supremes, often creating outfits from outfits available from local bridal shops. Powell left Motown in 1969 and taught personal development courses from 1971 until 1985 at Wayne County Community College.

On May 31, 2013, Powell suffered a fall. Her health steadily declined until her death of natural causes on October 14, 2013, at the age of 98 at Providence Hospital in Southfield, Michigan.
