= Lester G. Telser =

American economist

- Born: January 3, 1931; Chicago, Illinois, US
- Died: September 3, 2022 (aged 91); Chicago, Illinois, US

Academic background
- Education: University of Chicago; Roosevelt University
- Doctoral advisor: Milton Friedman

Lester Greenspan Telser (January 3, 1931 - September 3, 2022) was an American economist and Professor Emeritus in Economics at the University of Chicago.

== Education and career ==
He was a native of the Hyde Park neighborhood on the South Side of Chicago and a graduate of the Chicago Public Schools (Charles Kozminski elementary school and Hyde Park High School (now Hyde Park Academy High School)) and Roosevelt University, where he studied under Abba Lerner. He received his Ph.D. from the University of Chicago in 1956, with Milton Friedman as his principal thesis supervisor. He taught briefly at Iowa State University and was conscripted into the United States Army in which he served from 1956 to 1958. He was a member of the University of Chicago faculty from 1958 (emeritus at the time of death). He was a visitor at the Cowles Foundation (which had formerly been at the University of Chicago) at Yale University in 1964–1965 and at the Center for Operations Research in Econometrics (CORE) at the Catholic University of Louvain (Université catholique de Louvain) in Louvain (Leuven, Belgium) in 1969–1970.

== Contributions ==
His works include research on the theory of the core, Federal Reserve policy, and integer programming. Unusually for the Chicago school of economics, he also wrote about game theory as early as 1972.

A brief, personal history by Telser of the University of Chicago Economics Department including the importance of the Cowles Foundation is available as part of a symposium on "Living the Legacy: Chicago Economics through the Years." The University of California-Berkeley also created an oral history of modern economics and included an interview with Lester Telser.

== Awards and honors ==
In 1968 he became a Fellow of the Econometric Society and of the American Statistical Association.

== Books ==
- Functional Analysis in Mathematical Economics: Optimization Over Infinite Horizons (with Robert L. Graves, 1972).
- Competition, Collusion, and Game Theory (1972).
- Economic Theory and the Core (1978).
- A Theory of Efficient Cooperation and Competition (1987).
- Theories of Competition (1988).
- Joint Ventures of Labor and Capital (1997).
- Classic Futures: Lessons from the Past for the Electronic Age.
- The Core Theory in Economics: Problems and Solutions (2007).
