= Nano Pi =

Series of single-board computer

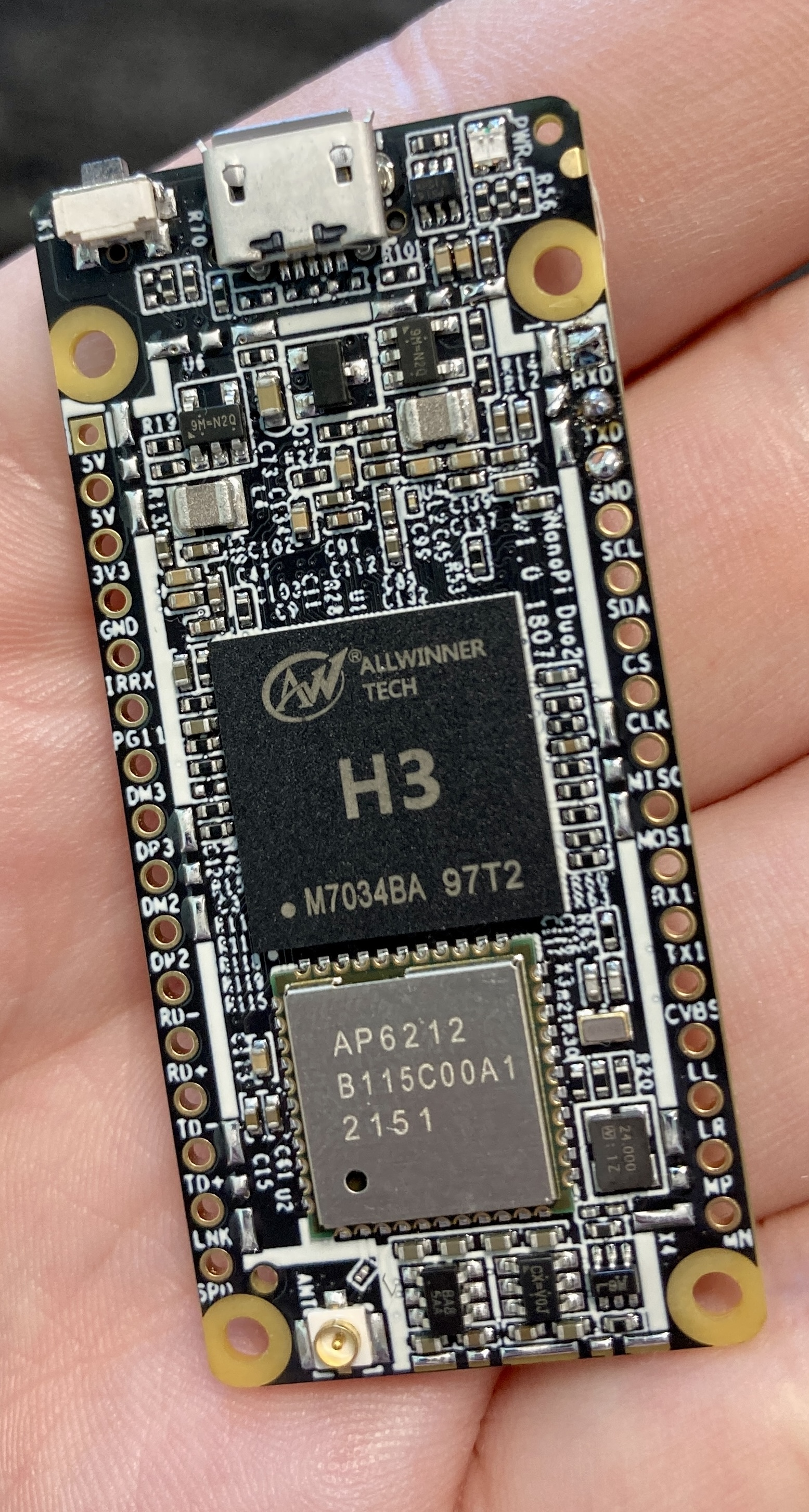
Nano Pi Duo2 powered by a Allwinner H3

The NanoPi is a series of single-board computer produced by FriendlyElec. Various versions of the board were released including the NanoPi M1+, NanoPi M3, NanoPi M4v2, NanoPi Neo3, NanoPi Neo4, NanoPi Neo Air, NanoPI R5C.

== Background ==
The NanoPi M1+ and Neo3 were reviewed as a smaller, cheaper, but less capable board than equivalent Raspberry Pi computers. The NanoPi 4 R6S have three ethernet ports.

Nano Pi computers have been used in experimental drones for disaster recovery and air quality monitoring.
