= Banana Pi =

Series of Chinese single-board computers

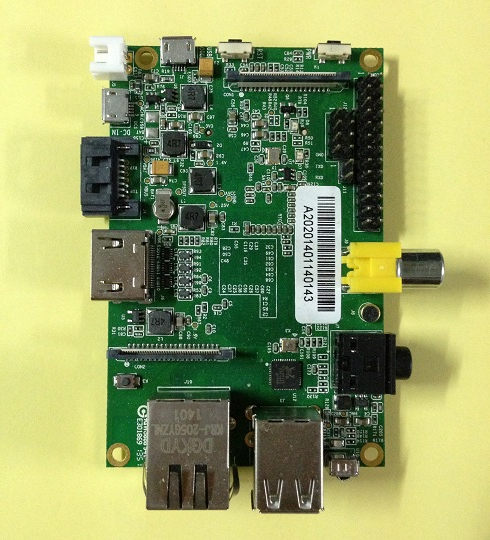
- Banana Pi BPI-M1
- Manufacturer: Shenzhen SINOVOIP Co., Ltd. (Chinese: 深圳市源创通信技术有限公司); Guangdong BiPai Technology Co., Ltd. (Chinese: 广东比派科技有限公司)
- Released: 29 April 2014; 12 years ago (1st Gen); 1 February 2021; 5 years ago (Current Gen)
- Operating system: Linux (incl Bananian, Raspberry Pi OS, Armbian, Fedora, Arch Linux ARM, openSUSE, CentOS, Kali Linux, Kano); FreeBSD; Android; OpenBSD; OpenMediaVault; ROKOS
- Marketing target: Global
- Website: Official website

Banana Pi
- Simplified Chinese: 香蕉派
- Traditional Chinese: 香蕉派
Transcriptions
Standard Mandarin
- Hanyu Pinyin: Xiāngjiāo Pài

Banana Pi is a line of single-board computers produced by the Chinese company Shenzhen SINOVOIP Company, its spin-off Guangdong BiPai Technology Company, and supported by Hon Hai Technology (Foxconn). Its hardware design was influenced by the Raspberry Pi, and both lines use the same 40-pin I/O connector.

Banana Pi also can run Android, Arch Linux, Debian, LineageOS, NetBSD, Raspberry Pi OS and Ubuntu operating systems, but the CPU complies with the requirements of the Debian armhf port. Most models use a MediaTek or Allwinner system on a chip with two or four ARM Cortex cores.

== Series and generations ==
=== Banana Pi BPI-M1 ===
The Banana Pi BPI-M1 features an Allwinner dual-core SoC at 1 GHz, 1 GB of DDR3 SDRAM, Gigabit Ethernet, SATA, USB, and HDMI connections, and a built-in 3.7V Li-ion battery-charging circuit. It can run on a variety of operating systems, including Android, Ubuntu, Debian, and Raspberry Pi OS.

Neither Banana Pi nor Shenzhen SINOVOIP Company has a direct relationship with the Raspberry Pi Foundation. Linux User & Developer does not consider it a "direct clone, but a considerable evolution," whilst linux.com sees it as a clone with improved performance.

=== Banana Pi BPI-M1+ ===
The Banana BPI-M1+ is a credit-card-sized, low-power single-board computer.

=== Banana Pi BPI-M2 ===
The Banana Pi M2 (BPI-M2) is a quad-core version of Banana Pi and supports onboard Wi-Fi.

=== Banana Pi BPI-M2+ (BPI-M2 Plus) ===
The Banana PI BPI-M2+, released in April 2016, has an Allwinner H3 SoC with a quad-core CPU and an onboard Wi-Fi module. It runs Android, Debian, Ubuntu, and Raspberry Pi OS.

=== Banana Pi BPI-M2 Zero ===
The Banana Pi BPI-M2 Zero is a low-power single-board computer with an Allwinner quad-core SoC at 1.2 GHz, 512 MB of DDR3 SDRAM, USB, Wi-Fi, Bluetooth and mini HDMI.

=== Banana Pi BPI-M2 Ultra ===
The Banana PI BPI-M2 Ultra (BPI-M2U) is an open-source hardware platform using the Allwinner R40 system-on-chip. It supports onboard Wi-Fi+BT and SATA. The 40-pin GPIO header is pin-compatible with the Raspberry Pi.

=== Banana Pi BPI-M2 Berry ===
The Banana PI BPI-M2 Berry (BPI-M2B) is an open-source hardware platform using the Allwinner V40 system-on-chip and supporting onboard Wi-Fi and Bluetooth.

=== Banana Pi BPI-M2 Magic ===
The Banana PI BPI-M2 Magic (BPI-M2M) is a single-board computer designed for internet-of-things applications and using the Allwinner R16 system on a chip.

=== Banana Pi BPI-M3 ===
The Banana Pi M3 is an open-source hardware platform. An octa-core version of Banana Pi, it supports onboard Wi-Fi and SATA and can run Android 5.1.1, Debian, Ubuntu, Raspberry Pi and other operating systems.

=== Banana Pi BPI-M4 ===
The Banana Pi BPI-M4 uses the Realtek RTD1395 system on a chip. It has 1 GB of RAM, 8 GB eMMC, onboard Wi-Fi for 802.11b/g/n/ac and BT 4.2.

=== Banana Pi BPI-M5 ===
The Banana Pi BPI-M5 uses the quad-core -A55 Amlogic S905X3 on a chip. 4 GB LPDDR4, 16 GB eMMC, 4x USB 3.0, GbE and HDMI, and 40-pin GPIO.

=== Banana Pi BPI-M5 Pro ===
The Banana Pi BPI-M5 uses the Rockchip RK3576 SoC on a chip. Up to 16 GB of LPDDR4x RAM, up to 128 GB of eMMC and MicroSD card slot for storage, 2 gigabit Ethernet ports, 3 USB ports, Wi-Fi 6, Bluetooth 5, 1 M.2 Key M interface, and 40-pin GPIO.

=== Banana Pi BPI-M6 ===
The Banana Pi BPI-M6 is a single-board computer featuring the Synaptics VideoSmart VS680 SoC, which includes:

- Senary(Synaptics) VideoSmart VS680 quad-core Cortex-A73 (2.1 GHz) and One Cortex-M3 processor
- Imagination GE9920 GPU
- NPU for AI up to 6 .75Tops
- 4GB LPDDR4
- 16GB eMMC flash
- M.2 Key E(PCIe + MIPI CSI)
- 4 USB 3.0
- 1 GbE Ethernet
- 1 HDMI in and 1 HDMI out

=== Banana Pi BPI-F2 ===
The Banana Pi BPI-F2 uses the Freescale i.MX6 system on a chip for the first time.

=== Banana Pi BPI-P2 Zero ===
The Banana Pi BPI-P2 Zero is a low-power single-board computer with an Allwinner quad-core SoC at 1.2 GHz, 512 MB of DDR3 SDRAM, USB, Wi-Fi, Bluetooth and mini HDMI.

=== Banana Pi BPI-F3 ===
The Banana Pi BPI-F3 uses the SpacemiT K1 8 core, 8-stage-pipeline dual issue RISC-V processor with RVV1.0 256-bit vector extension, claiming 2 TOPS performance in AI tasks. The BPI-F3 was officially announced on February 1, 2024.

=== Banana Pi BPI-S64 core ===
The Banana Pi BPI-S64 core uses the Actions S700 system on a chip.

=== Banana Pi BPI-R1 ===
The Banana Pi R1 is a 300 Mbit/s Wireless 802.11n router with wired and wireless network connections which is designed for home networking. With 2T2R MIMO technology and two detachable antennas, the R1 is a dual-core system that runs with Android 4.2.2.

=== Banana Pi BPI-R2 ===
The Banana PI BPI-R2 is an integrated multimedia network router which can be used for wireless home entertainment and automation. Integrating a quad-code ARM Cortex-A7 MPcore operating up to 1.3 GHz, the router supports a variety of peripherals.

=== Banana Pi BPI-R64 ===
The Banana PI BPI-R64 is a router-based development board which can run on a variety of open-source operating systems, including OpenWRT and Linux.

=== Banana Pi BPI-W2 ===
The BPI-W2 router has a quad-core ARM Cortex-A53 MPcore operating up to 1.5 GHz. Its GPIO is compatible with the Raspberry Pi 3.

=== Banana Pi BPI-D1 ===
The BPI-D1 is a small open-source development board with a built-in HD mini-camera. Able to be run from an external battery, it also has an audio sensor, microphone, CPU, GPIO, and Wi-Fi.

=== Banana Pi BPI-G1 ===
Banana Pi-G1 is an integrated IEEE 802.11 b/g/n (Wi-Fi wireless network), IEEE 802.15.4 (Zigbee), IEEE 802.11-2007 Standard (Bluetooth Low Energy 4.0) development board. All three wireless protocols can be used together. Wi-Fi uses TI CC3200, an ARM Cortex-M4 wireless SOC, internally-integrated TCP/IP protocol stack. This allows simple connection to the Internet using the BSD socket. The Zigbee uses TI CC2530, which integrates wireless capabilities and enhanced 8051 core SOC. Bluetooth 4.0 (BLE) uses TI CC2540/1, an integrated BLE stack and enhanced 8051-core, low-power wireless SOC.

=== Banana Pi Pro ===
The Banana Pi Pro is a credit card-sized, low-power single-board computer.

== Software ==
=== Operating systems ===
- Android 4.2.2 & 4.4 for Banana Pi (Linux kernel 3.4.39+, 4.4 doesn't support Wi-Fi and has many bugs, 4.2.2 doesn't support all apps in Korea)
- Arch Linux for Banana Pi (Linux kernel 3.4.103; 2014-12-26)
- Armbian stable, with more kernel options, Debian or Ubuntu userland (3.4.113, 4.9.7, 4.11.0; 5.5.2017)
- Bananian Linux (Debian based; Linux kernel 3.4.111; 2016-04-23)
- CentOS 7
- Fedora for Banana Pi (Linux kernel 3.4.103; 2014-12-26)
- Kali Linux for Banana Pi (Linux kernel 3.4.103)
- Kano for Banana Pi (Linux kernel 3.4.103)
- LineageOS for Banana Pi, Android (operating system)
- NetBSD
- OpenMediaVault
- OpenWrt
- openSUSE for Banana Pi (openSUSE v1412; Linux kernel 3.4.103; 2014-12-26)
- Raspbian for Banana Pi (Linux kernel 3.4.103; 2014-12-26)
- ROKOS for Banana Pi (Linux kernel 3.4.103; 2014-12-26)
- Scratch for Banana Pi (Boot to Scratch directly) (Linux kernel 3.4.103)

== See also ==
- List of open-source hardware projects
