= Louis S. Kahnweiler =

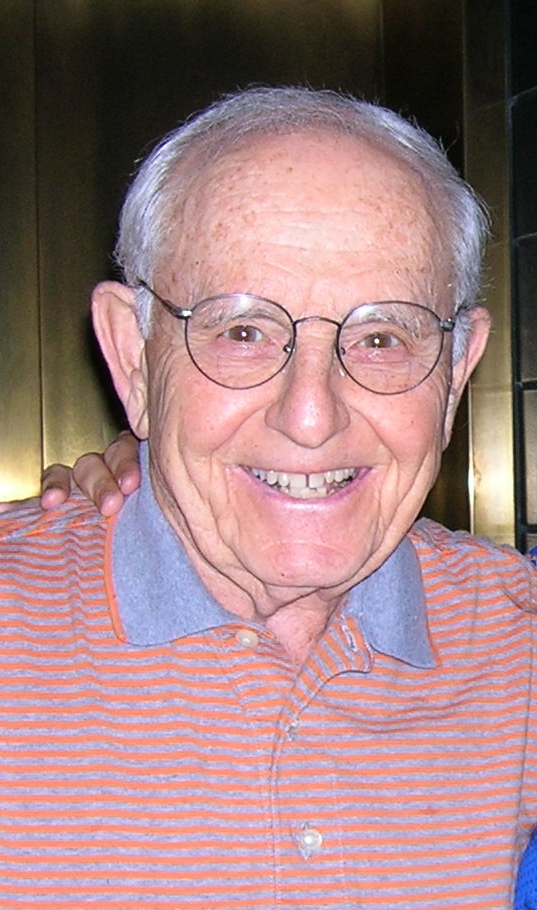
- Born: October 14, 1919; Chicago, Illinois, US
- Died: February 26, 2017 (aged 97); Lake Forest, Illinois, US
- Education: Northwestern University
- Spouse: Ruth Markus
- Children: 3

Louis S. Kahnweiler (October 14, 1919 – February 26, 2017) was an American real estate investor who co-founded the firm Bennett & Kahnweiler.

== Biography ==
Kahnweiler was born to a Jewish family in Chicago and was raised in the Hyde Park neighborhood. In 1937, he graduated from Hyde Park High School and in 1941 he graduated with a BA in business from Northwestern University. He served in the U.S. Navy. In 1947, he co-founded with Marshall Bennett the real estate development company Bennett & Kahnweiler. He is known for the development of industrial parks, including Centex Industrial Park in Elk Grove Village, Illinois, in 1957 located to the west of O'Hare Airport. Kahnweiler amassed a portfolio of 26 industrial parks around the country. In 1985, he added investment counseling, property management, office brokerage and development to a company better known as a broker of factories and developer of industrial parks. Kahnweiler's firm is now known as Colliers International, after investments by a Toronto-based commercial real estate servicer.

After service with the Office of Naval Intelligence during WWII, Kahnweiler took a job with Louis B. Beardslee & Co., a Chicago real estate brokerage firm while waiting to begin law school at Northwestern University.

At the firm he was told to find a buyer for an industrial building. So, he took out an advertisement in a newspaper, and to his surprise, the building was sold. He looked at his share of the commission, a $4,000 check, and chucked his plans for law school.

In 1946, Kahnweiler set up a brokerage shop with Jules Milten and later Marshall Bennett joined the firm. Three years later Milten left the partnership and the company became Bennett & Kahnweiler.

They brokered properties and constructed small industrial buildings on the Northwest Side. In 1957, the company moved into the national spotlight when they partnered with the Pritzker family of Chicago and Texas tycoon Clint Murchison Jr. to launch Centex Park in Elk Grove Village. At the time, it was the nation's largest industrial park with 2,250 acres, 1,500 companies, 40,000 employees and a value of more than $1 billion.

When Bennett left the firm in 1982, Kahnweiler decided to create an office-leasing department and hired Richard Berger to run it. In the first three years, the department went on to arrange $500 million in office leases.

Berger, who still manages the department, recalls of Kahnweiler that he was a “constant voice of integrity and kindness in the harsher world of real estate commerce”.

Today, Colliers Chicago employs more than 250 people in its two Chicago offices including a staff of 100 brokers and more than 125 property management professionals.

Among Kahnweiler's adages was "Don't ever become a prisoner of your financial lifestyle".

== Philanthropy ==
Kahnweiler was a life trustee of Roosevelt University. He was president of District 108 School Board in Highland Park, Illinois. He was on the board of directors of Highland Park General Hospital, Exchange National Bank of Chicago and Roosevelt University.

== Personal life ==
In 1948, he married Ruth Markus; they had three children: Nancy Kahnweiler Randall; William Kahnweiler, and Kathy Kahnweiler. He died on February 26, 2017, in Lake Forest, Illinois, of natural causes. Services were held at Mitzvah Memorial Funerals.
