= Mycron =

Norwegian microcomputer company

- Company type: Private company
- Industry: Information technology
- Founded: 1975
- Headquarters: Oslo, Norway
- Key people: Lars Monrad Krohn
- Products: Computers, Operating Systems

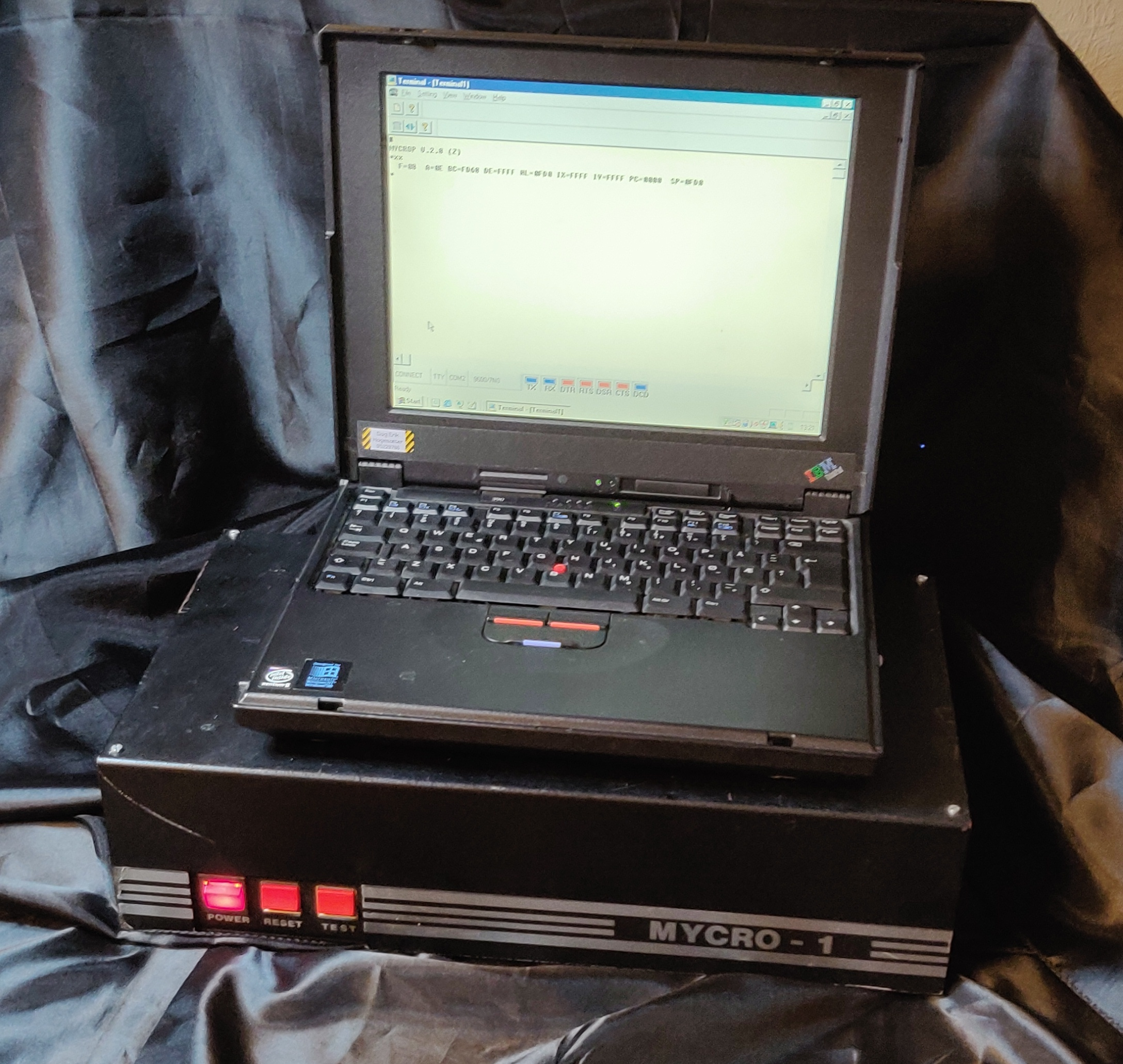
Mycro-1 connected to a terminal emulation program. It greets the user with the message: MYCROP V.2.8 (Z)

Mycron was a pioneer manufacturer of microcomputers, located in Oslo, Norway.

Originally named Norsk Data Industri, the company was founded in 1975 by Lars Monrad Krohn, who was also one of the founding fathers of Norsk Data. Among the employees are Arne Maus (1986–89) and Gisle Hannemyr. The company was renamed MySoft in 1999.

== Computers manufactured by Mycron ==
MYCRO-1 was an Intel 8080 machine, running the MYCROPoperating system. Afterwards the Mycron 3 was developed, running CP/M. The Mycron 1000 featured a Zilog Z80 processor and ran MP/M. In 1981, the Mycron 2000 was released, based on an Intel 8086 CPU, running CP/M-86 and MP/M-86 operating systems.

Model	Year	CPU	Operating system	Notes
MYCRO-1	1975	Intel 8080	MYCROP	First single-board computer (SBC)
Mycron 3	(tbd)	Zilog Z80	CP/M	
Mycron 1000	(tbd)	Zilog Z80	MP/M	64Kb RAM, 2 disk drives
Mycron 2000	1981	Intel 8086	CP/M-86; MP/M-86	One of the first Intel 8086 based computers; multiple CPUs in one cabinet. Weight of 8 kg and 38 cm size.
Mycron BC	1984	80186	MP/M, CP/M, MS-DOS	384kb RAM, 2 x 3,5" 400kb disk drive, 10Mb hard drive
Mycron 20	(tbd)	Intel 80186	MP/M	384KB RAM, 3.5" 400KB disk drive, 11MB hard drive
Mycron 200	(tbd)	(tbd)	CP/M-86	640KB RAM, 8" 1MB disk drive, 20MB hard drive
Mycron 2200	(tbd)	Intel 8086 (multiple)	MP/Net	640KB RAM per CPU, 8" 1MB disk drive; 20-84MB hard drive, 20MB tape drive options
Mycron 300	(tbd)	(tbd)	(tbd)	
