= Orange Pi =

Series of Chinese single-board computers

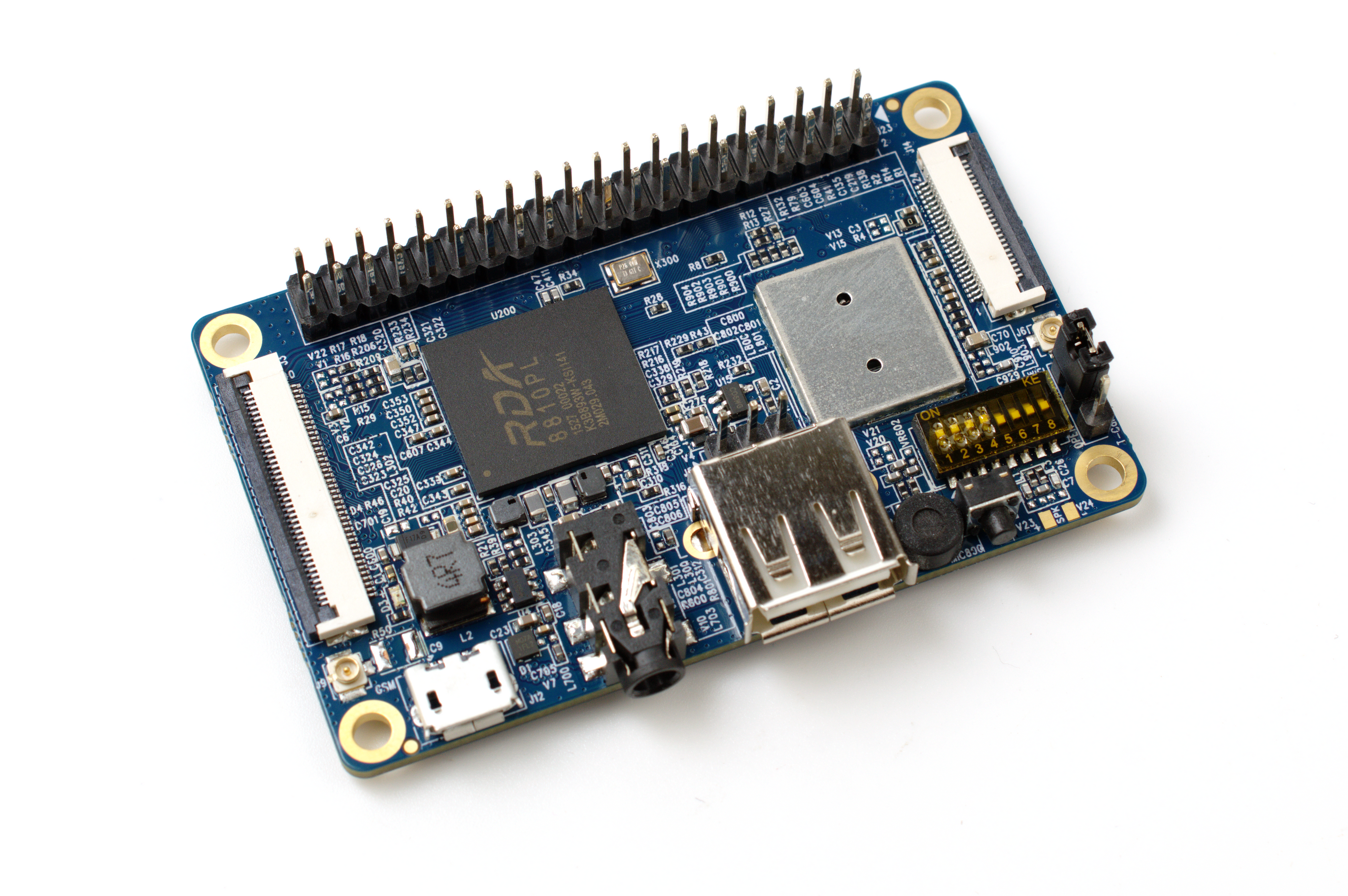
- The Orange Pi 2G IoT.
- Developer: Shenzhen Xunlong Software Co., Ltd
- Released: 2013
- Operating system: Orange Pi OS
- Website: www.orangepi.org

Orange Pi is a series of cost effective single-board computers (SBC) designed and manufactured by Shenzhen Xunlong Software Co., Ltd.

Orange Pi OS is the officially supported operating system for Orange Pi boards. However, the boards are compatible with other operating systems based on the Linux kernel such as Android.

The Orange Pi range competes with Raspberry Pi in the SBC market.

== History ==
The first model of Orange Pi was released in 2014. Thirty other models have been launched since.

In 2022, the company announced and released Orange Pi OS, an operating system that comes in three flavours. One is based on Huawei's HarmonyOS, the second is based on Arch Linux while the third, Orange Pi OS Droid, is based on the Android Open Source Project (AOSP).

The modern Orange Pi boards are also compatible with third-party operating systems, like Debian/Armbian, Ubuntu and Android.

As of 2025, Orange Pi OS appears to be based on Ubuntu Linux.

Orange Pi also partners with companies and higher education systems internationally, such as UCDavis, Oviton Technologie GmbH, and Makerlab Electronics.

== Models ==
A limited selection Orange Pi SBCs are shown below.

=== Orange Pi AIpro (20T) ===
The Orange Pi AIpro (20T) is a high-performance single-board computer developed in collaboration with Huawei, designed to cater to various artificial intelligence applications. It features a 4-core 64-bit processor combined with an AI processor, delivering up to 20 TOPS of AI computing power. This board is suitable for tasks such as AI teaching and training, AI algorithm verification, intelligent robotics, edge computing, and more.

Key specifications
Feature	Specification
CPU	4-core 64-bit processor + AI processor
AI Computing Power	20 TOPS
Memory	12GB/24GB LPDDR4X
Storage Options	eMMC module: 32GB/64GB/256GB; SATA/NVMe SSD (M.2 interface 2280) - SPI flash: 32MB - MicroSD slot
Display Outputs	2 × HDMI 2.0 (up to 4K@60FPS); 1 × MIPI DSI 4-lane
Camera Interfaces	2 × MIPI CSI 4-lane
USB Ports	3 × USB 3.0 host; 1 × USB Type-C 3.0 host/device (USB 2.0 compatible) - 1 × Type-C serial port
Networking	Dual 2.5G Ethernet; Wi-Fi 5 dual-band - Bluetooth 4.2, BLE
Audio	3.5mm headphone jack (audio in/out)
Expansion Interface	40-pin GPIO (supports GPIO, UART, I2C, SPI, I2S, PWM)
Power Supply	Type-C PD 20 V IN (standard 65 W)
Dimensions	115.23mm × 83.26mm × 1.6mm
Weight	120.5 g

The Orange Pi AIpro (20T) supports operating systems such as Ubuntu and openEuler, providing an environment for AI development.

=== Orange Pi 5 Ultra ===
The Orange Pi 5 Ultra is Orange Pi's newest model as of 2026, capable of achieving abilities like acting as an Android tablet, Linux desktop computer/server, and other high-performance tasks.

Key specifications
Supported OS(s)	OrangePi OS (Droid/Arch), Android 13, Debian 12/11, Ubuntu 20.04/22.04
CPU	Rockchip RK3588
GPU	ARM Mali-G610 (OpenGL ES1.1/2.0/3.2, OpenCL 2.2 and Vulkan 1.2)
NPU	Built-in with 6 Tops
Video	x1 HDMI 8K @ 60 Hz x1 HDMI 4K @ 60 FPS
Memory	4GB/8GB/16GB (LPDDR5)
Camera	x2 MIPI CSI 4-lane x1 MIPI D-PHY RX 4-lane
Onboard storage	16MB QSPI NOR flash MicroSD card slot PCIe 3x4 M.2 M-key SSD slots
Ethernet	x1 PCIe 2.5 GB port
Wireless	Onboard Wi-Fi 6E + BT 5.3/BLE
Connectivity	x2 USB 3.0 x2 USB 2.0 x2 HDMI
Physical	58 g 89mm × 56mm × 1.6mm

=== Orange Pi Prime ===
The Orange Pi Prime is a lower cost SBC, aimed at basic development of projects like wireless servers, computers, and video playback.

Key specifications
Supported OS(s)	Android, Ubuntu, Debian, RaspberryPi (images)
CPU	H5 quad-core Cortex -A53
GPU	ARM Mali-450 (OpenGL ES2.0, OpenVG 1.1)
NPU	N/A
Video	x1 HDMI
Memory	2 GB (DDR3)
Camera	CSI
Onboard storage	2 MB NOR flash TF card slot
Ethernet	1000/100M RJ45
Wireless	Onboard Wi-Fi IEEE 802.11 b/g/n + BT 4.0
Connectivity	x3 USB 2.0 x1 USB 2.0 OTG x1 HDMI
Physical	75 g 98mm × 60mm × 1.6mm

=== Orange Pi RV ===
The Orange Pi RV is a RISC-V capable SBC, aimed at development using RISC-V for a variety of applications such as complex image/video processing, and other high-performance tasks.

Key specifications
Supported OS(s)	Linux
CPU	JH-7110
GPU	N/A
NPU	N/A
Video	x1 HDMI
Memory	2GB/4GB/8GB (LPDDR4)
Camera	CSI
Onboard storage	M/2 NGFF PCIe TF card slot
Ethernet	10/100/1000 Mbps support
Wireless	Onboard Wi-Fi 5.0+ BT 5.0
Connectivity	x4 USB 3.0 PCIe to USB3 hub
Physical	54 g 89mm × 56mm × 1.6mm

=== Orange Pi R1 ===
The Orange Pi R1 is similar in use-cases with the Orange Pi Prime.

Key specifications
Supported OS(s)	OrangePi OS (Droid/Arch), Android 13, Debian 12/11, Ubuntu 20.04/22.04
CPU	H2 Quad-core Cortex-A7
GPU	ARM Mali-400MP2 (OpenGL ES2.0)
NPU	N/A
Video	N/A
Memory	256MB (DDR3)
Camera	N/A
Onboard storage	16 MB SPI flash TF card slot
Ethernet	100M/10M RJ45
Wireless	Onboard Wi-Fi IEEE 802.11 b/g/n
Connectivity	x3 USB 2.0 x1 USB 2.0 OTG x1 HDMI
Physical	48 g 45mm × 60mm × 1.6mm
