= Hyde Park Academy High School =

School in Chicago, Illinois, US

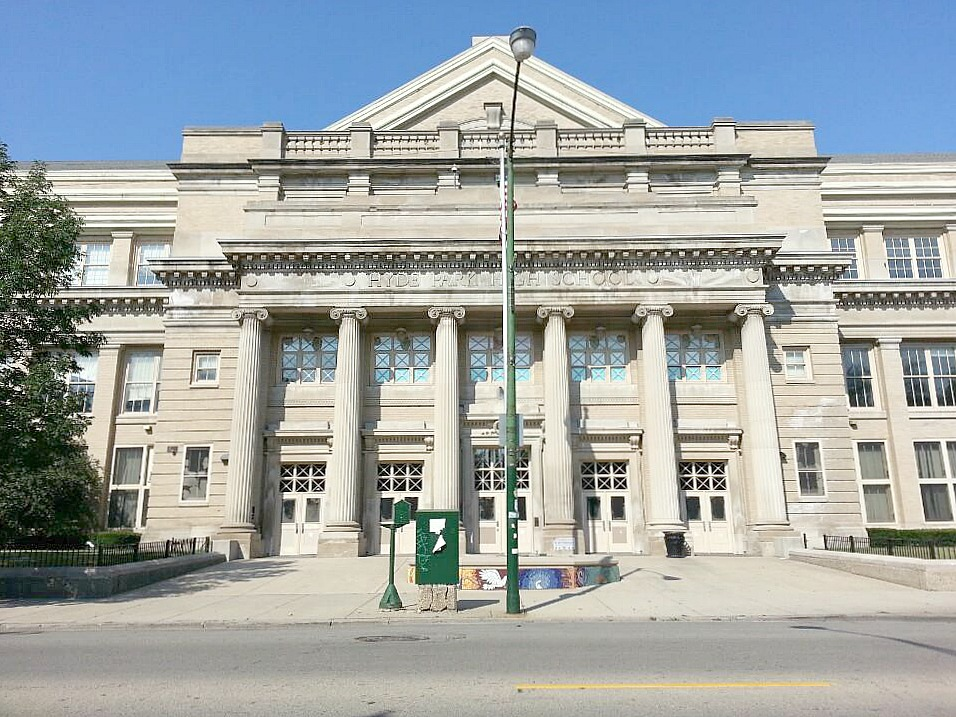

Location
- 6220 S. Stony Island Avenue; Chicago, Illinois 60615; United States; 41.7823°N 87.5871°W

Information
- Former name: Hyde Park Career Academy (1973–2012); Hyde Park High School (1863–1973)
- School type: Public; Secondary
- Motto: "The School of Choice"
- Established: 1863
- School district: Chicago Public Schools
- CEEB code: 140880
- Principal: Kenneth E. McNeal
- Grades: 9–12
- Gender: Coed
- Enrollment: 694 (2022–2023)
- Campus type: Urban
- Colors: Blue; White
- Athletics conference: Chicago Public League
- Team name: Thunderbirds
- Accreditation: North Central Association of Colleges and Schools
- Yearbook: The Aitchpe
- Website: hydeparkcps.org

Hyde Park Academy High School (formerly known as Hyde Park High School and Hyde Park Career Academy) is a public four-year high school located in the Woodlawn neighborhood on the south side of Chicago, Illinois, United States. Opened in 1863, Hyde Park is operated by the Chicago Public Schools (CPS) district and is located south of the University of Chicago. In 2012, Hyde Park became the fourth Chicago public high school to become an International Baccalaureate school.

== History ==
The school was established by the Chicago Board of Education as Hyde Park High School in 1863. The school was housed in several locations from its opening until 1886 when the board of education dedicated a three-floor school building located at Kimbark Avenue and 56th Streets in Hyde Park neighborhood. Hyde Park remained at the location from 1889 until it was decided that a new location was needed to house the school's growing population in 1910. Chicago officials decided on a site bordered by Stony Island Avenue to the east, Harper Avenue to the west, 62nd street to the north and 63rd Street to the south.

Hyde Park moved to its present site at 6220 South Stony Island Avenue in July 1914. The school underwent several major renovations during the 20th century. From the school's beginning, Hyde Park's student body was predominantly White. Whites were the highest populated in the area. The school's demographics began to change during the mid–1940s after the government pushed for integration of schools and neighborhoods. Over a span of twenty years beginning in 1947, the white population at the school began to decline due to whites being opposed to accepting low income African–Americans to attend the school. In January 1966, The Chicago board of education was charged with violation federal and state laws when they approved a plan to modernize Hyde Park (due to its growing population of African–Americans) and build a new high school that would serve Hyde Park's current white student body also attracting other white students located next to the school. The plan was in violation of the United States Civil Rights Act of 1964; the plan was never carried out.

By 1967, the school was predominantly African–American by a total of 97%. Although the demographics among students had changed, the teaching staff remained the same. The opening of Kenwood High School (now Kenwood Academy) in 1966 resulted in white enrollment at the school becoming negligible to non-existent; by the 1970–1971 school year, all 1,268 students enrolled were Black. In April 1973, the school became a magnet school and its name changed to Hyde Park Career Academy, establishing the school as a "career academy". The push to change the school's name and curriculum was made by then principal Weldon Beverly Jr. who served as principal of the school from 1975 until 2003.

Hyde Park began to offer International Baccalaureate classes to its students during the 2000–2001 school year. In 2004, Chicago Public Schools CEO Arne Duncan and Chicago mayor Richard M. Daley introduced the Renaissance 2010 program. Under this program, Hyde Park was forced to accept more than 300 more area–students than any other high school in the city during a two–year period. The school name changed to Hyde Park Academy High School in 2012 when the school became International Baccalaureate.

== Other information ==
On February 15, 2013, President Barack Obama delivered a televised speech in the school's gymnasium addressing the issue of gun violence in Chicago.

== Athletics ==
Hyde Park competes in the Chicago Public League (CPL) and is a member of the Illinois High School Association (IHSA). Hyde Park sport teams are known as Thunderbirds. Hyde Park team name and mascot were known as Indians from 1863 until 2009 when the IHSA regulations mandated that the school mascot be changed. Hyde Park boys' basketball team have been regional champions four times (2003–04, 2004–05, 2005–06, 2008–09). The boys' track and field placed first in the state in 1903 and 1929. The girls' basketball team won regional titles three consecutive seasons (2002–03, 2003–04, 2004–05).

== Notable alumni ==
- Steve Allen – comedian, songwriter, actor, original host of NBC's The Tonight Show
- Ruby Andrews – singer
- Carolyn M. Rodgers - Poet
- Boyd Bartley – former MLB player (Brooklyn Dodgers)
- Fred Beebe – former MLB player (St. Louis Cardinals, Chicago Cubs, Cincinnati Reds, Philadelphia Phillies, Cleveland Indians)
- Carl C. Bell (1965) – community psychiatrist, international researcher, academician, author, president/CEO
- Gwendolyn Brooks (attended) – poet and writer
- Paul Butterfield (1959) – blues singer in Blues Hall of Fame, Rock and Roll Hall of Fame
- L. Scott Caldwell (1967) – actress
- Amanda Crowe (1946) – artist and educator
- The Chi-Lites – recording artists, members of Vocal Group Hall of Fame
- Shawn Dean (2004) - professional wrestler
- Frances Dee (1927) – actress
- Melinda Dillon (1957) – Oscar-nominated actress, Close Encounters of the Third Kind, A Christmas Story
- Richard Durham – writer who developed the radio serial Destination Freedom in 1948
- Amelia Earhart (1915) – iconic aviator
- Walter Eckersall (1883) – college football Hall of Fame player
- Jane Fauntz – Olympic diving medalist
- Leon Finney Jr. (1957) – Chicago, Illinois-based minister, community organizer and businessman.
- Jeff Fort (attended) – former Chicago-based mobster and gang kingpin.
- Jerome Frank – United States Court of Appeals judge
- James Ingo Freed, architect
- Jim Fuchs – Olympic shot putter, two-time bronze medalist
- Joseph Glickauf – Arthur Andersen employee known as the "father of computer consulting"
- Brig. Gen. Thomas S. Hammond – football player and coach, industrialist and soldier
- Herbie Hancock (1958) – Grammy Award-winning jazz pianist, fusion keyboardist
- Will Harridge – MLB American League president 1931–59, member of Baseball Hall of Fame
- Donny Hathaway – Grammy-winning singer, songwriter, musician
- Christian Hopkins – NFL tight end New York Giants
- Geraldine Hunt – disco/dance singer, songwriter and producer
- Ina Ray Hutton – entertainer, leader of all-female band
- June Hutton – singer
- Janice K. Jackson (1995) – Educator, education administrator, former CEO of Chicago Public Schools.
- Mel Jackson (1988) – actor and spoken word artist known for "Soul Food" and "Living Single"
- Louis S. Kahnweiler (1937) – real estate developer
- Anna Langford (1935) – Politician, lawyer and alderman (16th Ward/Chicago, Illinois). Noted as the first African-American woman to be elected in Chicago City Council.
- Frederick C. Leonard (1914) – astronomer specializing in meteorites
- King Louie – rapper
- Joe Mays (2003) – NFL linebacker for the Philadelphia Eagles and Denver Broncos
- Arnie Morton, restauranteur
- Diane Nash – Civil Rights activist, Freedom rider
- Maxine Powell (1933) - Motown Records etiquette instructor and talent agent
- Cindy Pritzker - philanthropist
- Minnie Riperton (1964) – R&B and soul singer, mother of actress Maya Rudolph
- Renault Robinson (1960) – former Chicago Police Department officer and Chairman of the Chicago Housing Authority.
- Paul Samuelson – economist and Nobel Laureate
- Robert A. Sengstacke – photojournalist.
- Roger Sherman – football player for Michigan, coach for Iowa, and president of Illinois State Bar Association
- Vera Brady Shipman – arts journalist, composer, clubwoman
- Carole Simpson (1958) – newscaster, ABC
- Lester Telser (1948) – economist
- Miriam Higgins Thomas (1936) – Army chemist
- Mel Torme (1944) – singer, composer, 1999 recipient of Grammy Lifetime Achievement Award
- King Von – rapper
- Dick Anthony Williams – actor
- Conrad Worrill (1959) – writer
- G Herbo – rapper
- FBG Duck - rapper, songwriter

== Notable staff ==
- Timuel Black – Educator, civil rights activist, historian and author who taught at the school during the late–1950s to mid–1960s.
- William McAndrew – Educator and editor who was a teacher and later principal at the school, working there from 1888 until 1891
