= Embedded Compact Extended =

Embedded Compact Extended (ECX) is a small form factor Single Board Computer specification set out by Intel. ECX boards measure 105mm x 146mm.

The small size of the board gives it application in portable medical imaging devices and in-vehicle infotainment systems.
