= Joseph Glickauf =

American engineer (1912-2005)

Joseph Simon Glickauf Jr. (January 15, 1912 – July 9, 2005), was an American-born engineer, inventor and corporate executive known as one of the first advocates of the use of computers in business and industry and the "father" of the computer consulting industry.

Glickauf graduated from Hyde Park High School in Chicago and attended Illinois Institute of Technology. He joined the United States Navy in 1942 and was assigned to the Research Division of the Bureau of Supplies and Accounts. He became a lieutenant. After leaving the navy, he was hired by Arthur Andersen Co. immediately in 1946 and was tasked with initiating the use of the freshly invented computer for his employer. Glickauf became familiar with the capabilities of the UNIVAC (Universal Automatic Computer) and immediately saw the far-reaching implications of computers for business. To demonstrate the computer to Arthur Andersen's employees he built the Arthur Andersen Demonstration Computer known as "Glickiac". The company management was quick to see the potential and made resources available for future development.

In 1953 General Electric Appliances hired Arthur Andersen to automate GE's payroll. Glickauf lead the effort and recommended GE the installation of a UNIVAC I computer and printer. The project was initially a failure but it started what is now known as "computer consulting".

He is buried at Plum Lake Cemetery, Sayner, Wisconsin.
