= MYCRO-1 =

1974 microcomputer model

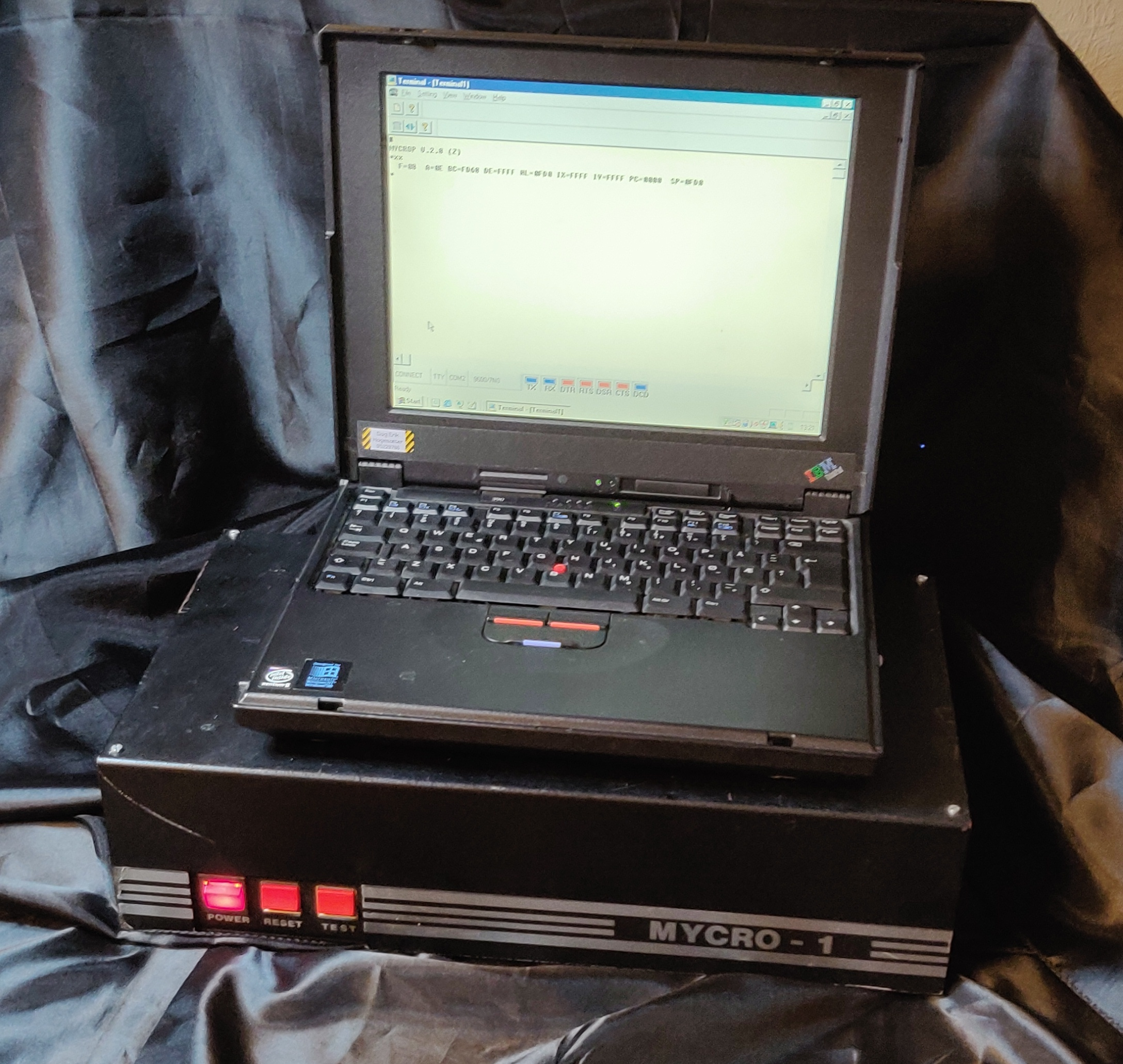
Mycro-1. (2019) Connected to a terminal emulation program. It greets you with: MYCROP V.2.8 (Z)

The MYCRO-1 was a microcomputer manufactured and sold by Mycron of Oslo, Norway, in 1974. Built around the Intel 8080 CPU, it was one of the first commercial single-board computer after the Intel SDK-80. One is currently displayed at the Norwegian Museum of Science and Technology.

When introduced, it was sold for approximately $6.000

MYCRO-1 is a microcomputer system based on the microprocessor Intel 8080. Some models have a Zilog Z80 CPU. Since the Z80 is backward compatible with the 8080, this was probably a cost reduction measure. The MYCRO-1 system was designed by MYCRON Data Industri as an entry In the market place for higher powered microcomputer systems.

A typical basic configuration of the system:

- DIM-1001 CPU
- DIM-1013 16K-byte dynamic RAM
- DIM-1090 Chassis with motherboard
- DIM-1091 Power supply with switch panel

== The modules available for the MYCRO-1 system ==
=== Computer modules ===
- DIM-1001 CPU (8080)
- DIM-1003 CPU (Z80)
- DIM-1027 High-speed slave CPU

=== Memory modules ===
- DIM-1010 4K-byte static RAM
- DIM-1012 4K-byte PROM
- DIM-1013 16K-byte dynamic RAM
- DIM-1014 6K-byte EPROM
- DIM-1015 16K-byte static RAM
- DIM-1016 64K-byte dynamic RAM

=== Input/output modules ===
- DIM-1019 Dual Serial I/O, Synchronous/Asynchronous
- DIM-1020 4-channel serial I/O
- DIM-1021 Two input and two output parallel I/O
- DIM-1022 Triple serial I/O module
- DIM-1030 Floppy disc controller
- DIM-1031 Floppy disc controller
- DIM-1035 12M-byte disk drive

=== Process control modules ===
- DIM-1023 32-channel digital input module
- DIM-1025 8-channel pulse counter module
- DIM-1026 16-channel digital output module
- DIM-1029 16-channel level detector input module
- DIM-1042 16-channel analog input modules
- DIM-1043 8-channel analog output module
- DIM-1044 16-channel analog diff. amp. input

=== Data storage ===
- DIP 11133 Single floppy disk drive unit
- DIP 11134 Double floppy disk drive unit

=== Mycro-1 modules ===
- DIM-1090 Chassis with motherboard
- DIM-1091 Power supply with switch panel

=== Peripherals ===
- DIP-1022 Display
- DIP-1023 Teletype

=== Software ===
- DIS 1001 PROCOM
- DIS 1002/1022 MYCRA one-pass assembler
- DIS 1003 Editor text page editor
- DIS 1007 Diskette service package
- DIS 1010/1018 Floating point software packages
- DIS 1011 Basic interpreter
- DIS 1012 DDS diskette dataset support
- DIS 1014 Mycrop diskette based monitor
- DIS 1015 EPROM programmer routines
- DIS 1018 Floating point software package
- DIS 1019 QEdit Text editor
- DIS 1020 Multi-access disk driver
- DIS 1021 Mycrop with remote disk access
- DIS 1024 Fast floating point micro program for DIM 1027
- DIS 1024E Communication package for Nord-10
- DIS 1027 MyMon. A real-time and time-sharing monitor for Mycro-1
- DIS 1029 PL/Mycro resident one-pass compiler
- DIS 1030 DINIT diskette initialization program
- DIS 1031 GRTS 115/Mycro-1 emulator
- DIS 1032 Trace - a software debugging tool
- DIS 1033 MyReg system for data registration on diskette
- DIS 1034 Utility routines on the Mycron system diskette
- DIS 1035 Pas 80 sequential Pascal compiler
- DIS 1036 DLSM dataset label maintenance
