= Cyberdeck =

Type of personal mobile computing device

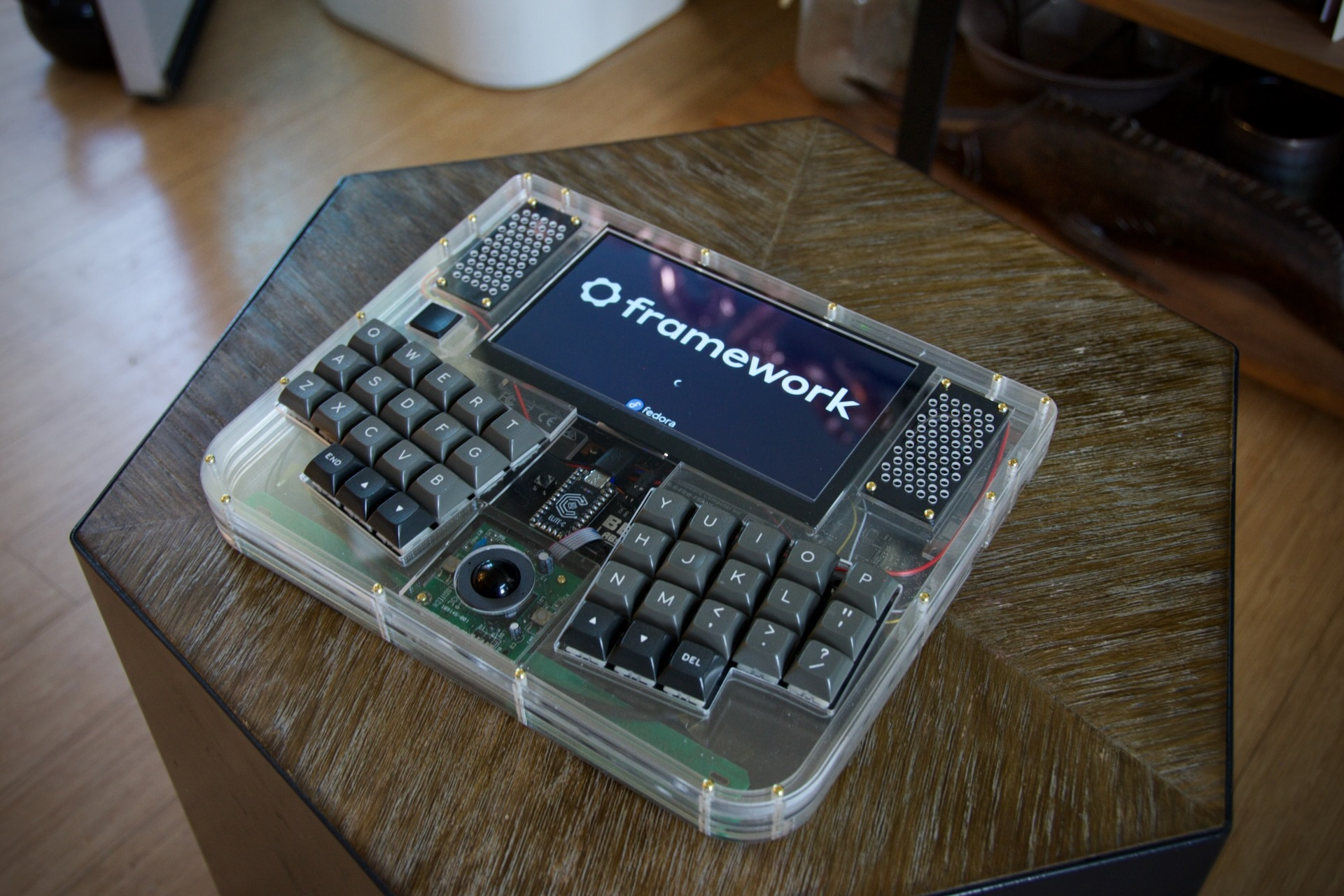
Framedeck, a Framework mainboard based cyberdeck with clear acrylic and brass influenced by TRS-80 Model 100.

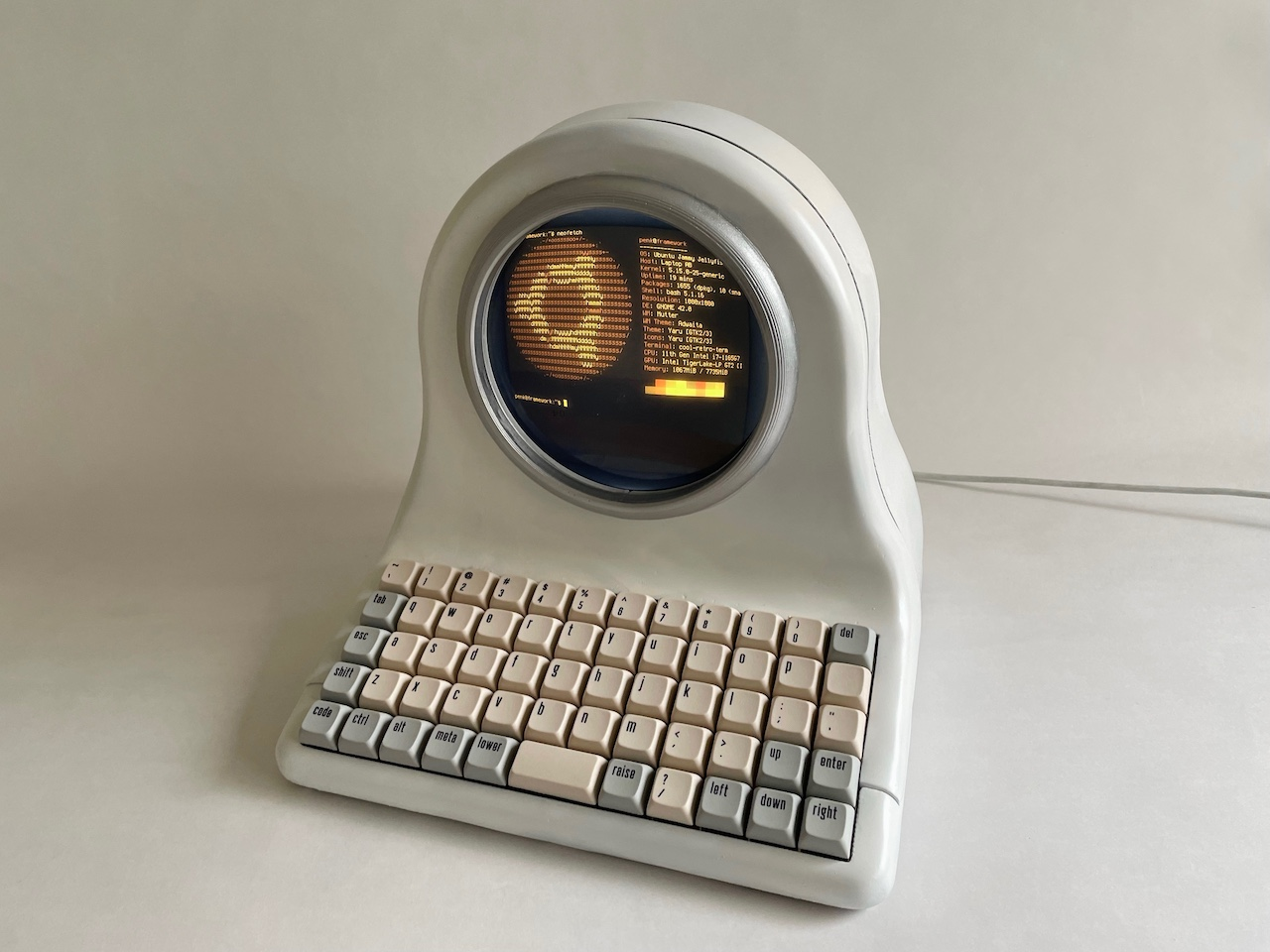
Mainboard Terminal, a retro-style round display PC that uses the Framework's mainboard with Ubuntu.

A cyberdeck or cyber deck is a custom-built, portable personal computer, often one designed for a particular individualized purpose and usually with a cyberpunk aesthetic. These devices are typically individually crafted, powered by laptop motherboards or single-board computers (SBCs), such as Raspberry Pis or Intel Boards, and include a display and keyboard.

== Terminology ==
The term "cyberdeck" is a shortened form of "cyberspace deck", which first appeared in William Gibson's 1984 novel Neuromancer. It has become shorthand across multiple forms of cyberpunk media for a personal mobile computing device used to enter cyberspace in some form or fashion. For example, cyberdecks (often shortened to decks) appear throughout the Cyberpunk table-top roleplaying (TTRPG) series and the video game series it subsequently spawned, as well as in the science fantasy TTRPG Shadowrun.

Individuals who create or utilize cyberdecks are known as deckers.

A cyberdeck created specifically for writing is known as a writerdeck.

== History ==
In 2022, Hackaday.io ran its first Cyberdeck Contest, leading to individuals submitting more than 100 such creations. They would run a second such contest in 2023. Rather than buying a standard commercial laptop, builders design and assemble their own rigs using single board computers (such as Raspberry Pi) or repurpose old laptops’ mainboards to make their own rigs. These rigs are paired with a custom mechanical keyboard and compact screen, and fit inside a 3D-printed body or modified waterproof hard cases.

In 2026, TechCrunch reported that cyberdeck communities "have exploded in popularity thanks to women on social media" who have created "artistic, hyper-feminine" cyberdecks.

== Hardware architecture and structural design ==
The internal architecture of a cyberdeck is centered on a single-board computer which uses system-on-a-chip (SOC) to keep the computer’s main processor, graphics, and external connecting ports together on a compact board. When selecting the components, builders consider the trade-offs between the physical size, processing speed, and battery life of a cyberdeck. Aside from the main computer, most of the designs have microcontroller connected to serial lines like I2C to handle auxiliary tasks like reading buttons, controlling lights, and showing small display so that the main processor’s workload is reduced.

Instead of using a normal laptop’s outer case, a cyberdeck builder makes the frame themselves by using 3D printer and laser cutter. This frame isn’t just for the show or design, but it is the main component to hold all the other internal components of the cyberdeck. By using 3D printing techniques like FDM, one can print out the whole structure of the base like mounting posts, internal walls, and wiring channels directly inside the case.

== Power management and portability systems ==
Designing a cyberdeck's power system involves calculating the total current draw of the single-board computer, attached screen, radio modules, and other input parts. Additionally, the central challenge builders experience is balancing the battery run-out time, extra weight of the bigger battery, and the thermal heat produced inside the small box.

In most of the cases, cyberdecks run through rechargeable lithium-ion battery part and voltage regulation circuit. The step-up or step-down voltage regulators prevent the voltage fluctuations and give steady power supply to the sensitive semiconductor parts. Aside from that, builders connect the battery management system (BMS) and protection board directly to the wire of the battery. These boards check each and every cell’s voltage, prevent the battery from draining completely and getting damaged, protect it from short circuit and control the thermal heat generated while running the machine.

== Software architecture and operating systems ==
Cyberdeck builders generally choose the software that consumes very little of the RAM and battery and the one that is easy to fit with the hardware it is connected to. Most of the creators utilize open-source Linux due to the operating system’s modifiable code that allows users to configure the system’s kernel according to the necessities of the hardware, to close the unnecessary machine services running in the background, and to remove the pre-installed packages unnecessary to the system. Stripping the software to keep it lightweight enables smooth performance even on hardware with less processing power and less memory.

To make machines turn on faster and make save batteries for a longer period of time, many builders opt to skip the graphical desktop environment. Instead of that, they use lightweight window managers or text-only terminal interfaces. Using a text based simple screen helps a lot with less electricity consumption and RAM’s load. Even without graphical apps, the text writing programs in this terminal environment, code compiling tools and tools to check the internal status of the computer can be used easily. Many builders install minimal terminal multiplexers and custom shell environments to use multiple command-line tools together without the need of big and heavy graphical interface.

== Communications and field networking ==
Many cyberdecks include extra radio hardware so they can communicate even without regular internet or network access. Unlike the old hardware radio that require hardware modifications, connecting Software-Defined Radio (SDR) allows computer to receive, transmit and monitor the radio signal directly through software. This allows operator to modify the channel frequency, bandwidth and decoding’s setting through the software without changing any physical wires or part of the cyberdeck.

Most of the cyberdecks use low-power radio based on LoRa protocol to transmit data without the internet connection. Since LoRa uses Chirp Spread Spectrum (CSS) modulation, even with lots of disturbance and outer obstruction in the radio signal, data can travel to long distances easily. These devices run on frequency levels that do not need license to run – for example 433 MHz in Asia, 868 MHz in Europe, and 915 MHz in North America and Australia. Because of this radio setup, cyberdecks can send text message and data of the sensors directly to other devices without relying on the commercial internet companies or mobile towers.Builders usually use decentralized mesh communication tools like Meshtastic in these LoRa modules due to which many portable units can send text to each other without any cell tower.

== Applications and community ==
Given the personalized nature of cyberdecks, they are often created to fulfill specific, individualized use cases. Such computers have been created for the preservation of knowledge in a post-apocalyptic scenario, for radio frequency surveillance, for cybersecurity work, or to receive data transmitted by satellites. Alternatively, some cyberdecks appear to be created for purely aesthetic purposes, such as to mirror the appearance of devices in the Alien franchise.

Building a cyberdeck is an important part of DIY hardware and maker subculture. Instead of using the commercial laptops, enthusiasts customize and assemble the machine according to their necessities and personalized work. These machines are frequently configured as writerdecks, or utilized to review the security of local networks. Few of these writerdecks use low-power electronic paper screens in order to make glare-free typing setups that can run for a long time even on small battery packs. It also lets users communicate with each other during power outages or network disruptions.

This community relies on open-source hardware sharing and the users’ collaborations. Cyberdeck builders upload their 3D-print files, circuit diagrams and parts lists in online maker forums and repositories like r/cyberDeck(Reddit) and Hackaday discord servers for other builders to inspect and build upon. Along with this, builders share their detailed build log and take part in annual build contest to showcase their new ideas for casing design, layout of mechanical keyboard and ideas for internal wiring methods. The annual Hackaday Cyberdeck Contest is one of the primary competitions in which makers submit custom designs and evaluate portable hardware implementations. Community discussions and design feedback are organized and there are collaborative maker spaces like Hackaday.io, code repositories like GitHub, GitLab and online discussion forums for makers to share their work and review others' work.
