= Single-board computer =

Computer whose components are on a single printed circuit board

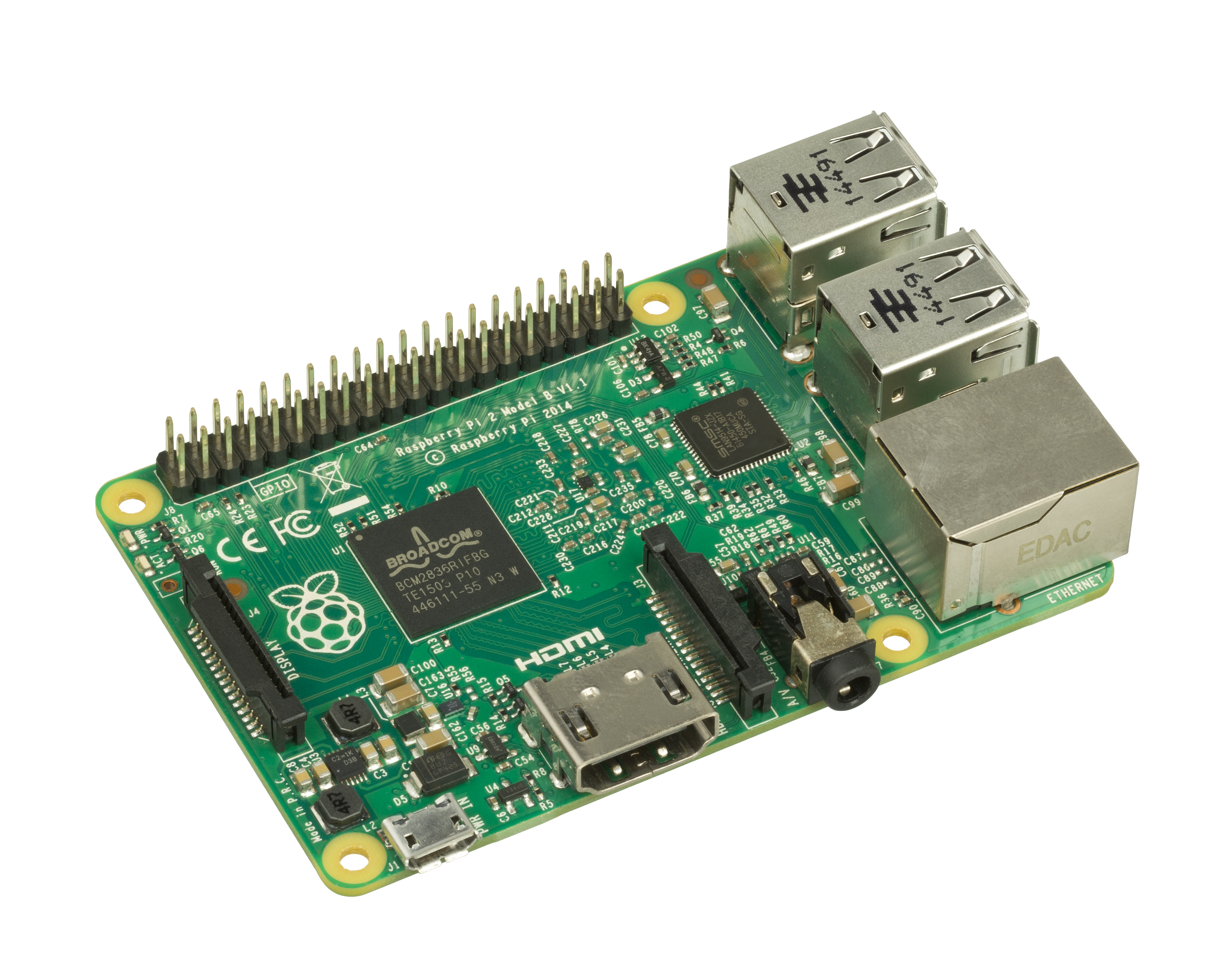
The Raspberry Pi (Model 2B shown) is a low-cost single-board computer often used to teach computer science.

A single-board computer (SBC) is a complete computer built on a single circuit board, with microprocessor(s), memory, input/output (I/O) and other features required of a functional computer. Single-board computers are commonly made as demonstration or development systems, for educational systems, or for use as embedded computer controllers. Many types of home computers or portable computers integrate all their functions onto a single printed circuit board.

Unlike a desktop personal computer, single-board computers often do not rely on expansion slots for peripheral functions or expansion. Single-board computers have been built using a wide range of microprocessors. Simple designs, such as those built by computer hobbyists, often use static RAM and low-cost 32- or 64-bit processors like ARM. Other types, such as blade servers, would perform similar to a server computer, only in a more compact format.

A computer-on-module is a type of single-board computer made to plug into a carrier board, baseboard, or backplane for system expansion.

== History ==
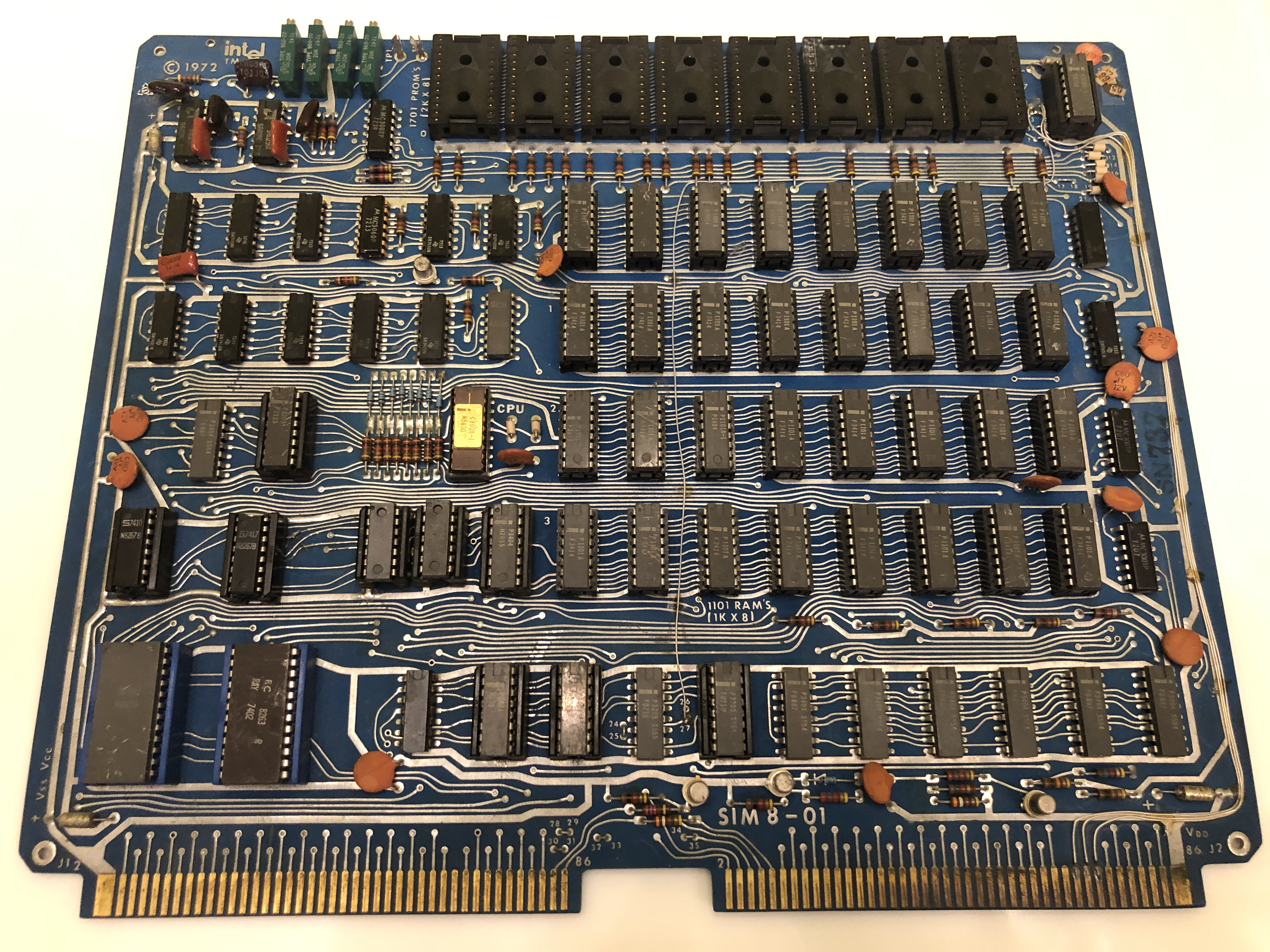
Intel SIM8-01, Dated 1972

=== Early SBCs ===
The first single-board computers were introduced shortly after the first microprocessors arrived on the market. In 1971 and 1972 respectively, Intel came out with the SIM4-01 and SIM8-01 development boards. The SIM8-01 board is based on the Intel 8008 and contains a CPU, RAM, ROM, and a TTY terminal interface.

The same interface was common in the Intel 8080-based MYCRO-1, released in December 1974, and the Intel SDK-80 and the Motorola MEK6800D1, released in 1975. A cheaper and subsequently more popular single-board computer, the KIM-1 based on the MOS 6502, would be announced later in 1975 and released in 1976.

Early SBCs featured heavily in the early history of home computers, such as the Acorn Electron, BBC Micro, the Ferguson Big Board, the Ampro Little Board, and the Nascom. Other typical early single-board computers like the KIM-1 were often shipped without enclosure, which had to be added by the owner. Many home computers in the 1980s were single-board computers, with some even encouraging owners to solder upgraded components directly to pre-marked points on the board.

In the 1990s, the PC became more prevalent due to the standardisation of the PCI bus and the adoption of IBM's standards for peripherals , which made motherboards, compatible components, and peripherals cheap and ubiquitous. The development of multimedia platforms such as the CD-ROM and Sound Blaster cards had also begun to fast outpace the rate at which users needed to replace their personal computers. These two trends disincentivized single-board computers, and encouraged the proliferation of motherboards, which typically housed the CPU and other core components, with peripheral components such as hard disk drive controllers and graphics processors, and even some core components such as RAM modules, located on daughterboards.

Computers began to move back towards fewer boards in the 2000s. As new standards like USB reduced the variety of peripheral standards motherboards were expected to support, advances in integrated circuit manufacturing provided new chipsets which could provide the functionality of many daughterboards, particularly I/O, in a single chip. By the end of the decade, PC motherboards offered on-board support for disk drives including IDE, SATA, NVMe, RAID, integrated GPU, Ethernet, and traditional I/O such as serial port and parallel port, USB, and keyboard/mouse support.

Single-board computers saw rapid growth during the 2010s due to advances in integrated circuit production that allowed most or all motherboard components to be placed on a single die. The Raspberry Pi, built around a custom Broadcom SoC with open-source drivers, was originally designed for education, but included features such as Linux support and programmable GPIO pins that were used by hobbyists for projects including home automation, video game emulation, and streaming. In industry, the growth of smartphones and other small devices led manufacturers to adopt SoCs more widely and shrink motherboards, while the spread of Internet-connected devices increased demand for small, inexpensive components.

By the end of the 2010s and into the 2020s, smartphones, tablets, laptops, and other smart devices commonly used single-board computers built around SoCs.

== Applications ==
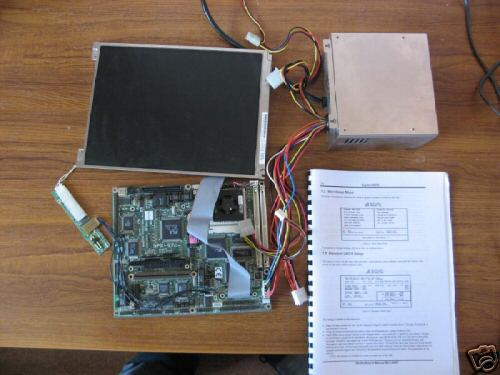
A socket 3 based 486 SBC with power supply and flatscreen

Single-board computers were made possible by increasing the density of integrated circuits. A single-board configuration reduces a system's overall cost, by reducing the number of circuit boards required, and by eliminating connectors and bus driver circuits that would otherwise be used. By putting all the functions on one board, a smaller overall system can be obtained, for example, as in notebook computers. Connectors are a frequent source of reliability problems, so a single-board system eliminates these problems.

Single-board computers are now commonly defined across two distinct architectures: no slots and slot support.

Embedded SBCs are units providing all the required I/O with no provision for plug-in cards. Applications are typically gaming (slot machines, video poker), kiosk, and machine control automation. Embedded SBCs are much smaller than the ATX-type motherboard found in PCs, and provide an I/O mix more targeted to an industrial application, such as on-board digital and analog I/O, on-board bootable flash memory (eliminating the need for a disk drive), no video, etc.

The term single-board computer now generally applies to an architecture where the single-board computer is plugged into a backplane to provide for I/O cards. In the case of PC104, the bus is not a backplane in the traditional sense but is a series of pin connectors allowing I/O boards to be stacked.

Single-board computers are most commonly used in industrial situations where they are used in rackmount format for process control or embedded within other devices to provide control and interfacing. They are used in deep-sea exploration on the ALICE deep sea probes and in outer space, on the Ariane and Pegasus rockets and Space Shuttle. Because of the very high levels of integration, reduced component counts and reduced connector counts, SBCs are often smaller, lighter, more power efficient and more reliable than comparable multi-board computers.

The primary advantage of an ATX motherboard as compared to an SBC is cost. Motherboards are manufactured by the millions for the consumer and office markets allowing tremendous economies of scale. Single-board computers are a market niche and are manufactured less often and at a higher cost. Motherboards and SBCs now offer similar levels of feature integration meaning that a motherboard failure in either standard will require equivalent replacement.

== Types, standards ==
Ranges of single-board computers include Raspberry Pi, BeagleBoard, LattePanda, Nano Pi, ODROID, Orange Pi, PINE64, and Banana Pi.

One common variety of single-board computer uses standardized computer form factors intended for use in a backplane enclosure. Some of these types are CompactPCI, PXI, VMEbus, VXI, and PICMG. SBCs have been built around various internal processing structures including the Intel architecture, multiprocessing architectures, and lower power processing systems like RISC and SPARC. In the Intel PC world, the intelligence and interface/control circuitry is placed on a plug-in board that is then inserted into a passive (or active) backplane. The result is similar to having a system built with a motherboard, except that the backplane determines the slot configuration. Backplanes are available with a mix of slots (ISA, PCI, PCI-X, PCI-Express, etc.), usually totaling 20 or fewer, meaning it will fit in a 19" rackmount enclosure (17" wide chassis).

Some single-board computers have connectors that allow a stack of circuit boards, each containing expansion hardware, to be assembled without a traditional backplane. Examples of stacking SBC form factors include PC/104, PC/104-Plus, PCI-104, EPIC, and EBX; these systems are commonly available for use in embedded control systems.

Stack-type SBCs often have memory provided on plug-cards such as SIMMs and DIMMs. Hard drive circuit boards are also not counted for determining if a computer is an SBC or not for two reasons, firstly because the HDD is regarded as a single block storage unit, and secondly because the SBC may not require a hard drive at all as most can be booted from their network connections.

== Form factors ==
- AdvancedTCA
- CompactPCI
- Embedded Compact Extended (ECX)
- Mini-ITX
- Multibus
- PC/104
- PICMG
- Pico-ITX
- PXI
- Qseven
- VMEbus
- VPX
- VXI
- 96Boards (CE, EE, EETV and IE)

== See also ==
- Computer on module
- Embedded system
- Motherboard
- Plug computer
- Single-board microcontroller
- System on a chip
- List of open-source computing hardware
- Raspberry Pi
- Nano Pi
- Orange Pi
- Banana Pi
- Cyberdeck
