= Radeon RX series =

Radeon RX series is a series of graphics processors developed by AMD. It can refer to:

- Radeon RX Vega series
- Radeon RX 5000 series
- Radeon RX 6000 series
- Radeon RX 7000 series
- Radeon RX 9000 series

== See also ==
- Radeon X Series
