= Steaming (disambiguation) =

Steaming is a form of cooking that uses steam as the main heating method.

Steaming may also refer to:

- Soil steam sterilization
- Hay steaming, a method of treating hay to remove airborne dust
- Steam bending, a method of bending wood with steam
- Vaginal steaming, a controversial alternative health treatment
- Steaming (film), a 1985 film directed by Joseph Losey
- Steaming (play), a 1981 play by Nell Dunn
- Steaming (crime), robbery on a train or bus, usually perpetrated by a gang, often violent
- Slow steaming, operating ships at low speeds to save fuel
- A song appearing on Sarah McLachlan's 1988 debut album Touch
- steam engine operation, particularly operating a ship powered by steam
- Steaming, journal of the National Traction Engine Trust

== See also ==
- Steam (disambiguation)
