= Radeon 7000 series =

Radeon 7000 series may refer to:

- AMD Radeon RX 7000 series, a computer graphics card series introduced in 2022
- AMD Radeon HD 7000 series, a computer graphics card series from 2012
- ATI Radeon 7000, a computer graphics card series from 2001
