= RDNA (microarchitecture) =

GPU microarchitecture and accompanying instruction set architecture

AMD RDNA
- Release date: July 7, 2019 (7 years ago)
- Designed by: AMD
- Fabrication process: TSMC N7; TSMC N6; TSMC N5; TSMC N4

History
- Predecessor: Graphics Core Next 5

Support status
- Supported

A generic block diagram of a GPU

RDNA (Radeon DNA) is a graphics processing unit (GPU) microarchitecture and accompanying instruction set architecture developed by AMD. It is the successor to their Graphics Core Next (GCN) microarchitecture/instruction set. The first product lineup featuring RDNA was the Radeon RX 5000 series of video cards, launched on July 7, 2019. The architecture is also used in mobile products. It is manufactured and fabricated with TSMC's N7 FinFET graphics chips used in the Navi series of AMD Radeon graphics cards.

The second iteration of RDNA was first featured in the PlayStation 5 and Xbox Series X/S consoles. Both consoles utilize a custom RDNA 2-based graphics solution as the basis for their GPU microarchitecture. On PC, RDNA 2 is featured in the Radeon RX 6000 series of video cards, which first launched in November 2020. RDNA 2 is also featured in Samsung's Exynos 2200 as the graphics architecture, and in Valve's Steam Deck.

The third iteration of RDNA was announced on November 3, 2022, and is featured in the Radeon RX 7000 series of consumer desktop and mobile graphics cards.

The fourth and latest iteration of RDNA was unveiled on January 6, 2025, at CES and is used in the Radeon RX 9000 series of desktop graphics cards.

== Instruction set ==
AMD's GPUOpen website hosts PDF documents aiming to describe the environment, the organization and the program state of RDNA devices. They detail the instruction set and the microcode formats native to this family of processors that are accessible to programmers and compilers.

Documentation is available for:

- the Radeon DNA 1 instruction set,
- the Radeon DNA 2 instruction set,
- the Radeon DNA 3 instruction set,
- the Radeon DNA 3.5 instruction set,
- the Radeon DNA 4 instruction set.

== RDNA 1 ==
AMD RDNA 1
- Release date: July 7, 2019 (7 years ago)
- Codename: Navi 1x
- Fabrication process: TSMC N7

History
- Predecessor: Graphics Core Next 5
- Successor: RDNA 2

Support status
- Supported

RDNA 1 (also RDNA1) is the first implementation of the RDNA microarchitecture and is the successor to the Radeon RX Vega series. The launch occurred on July 7, 2019.

=== Architecture ===
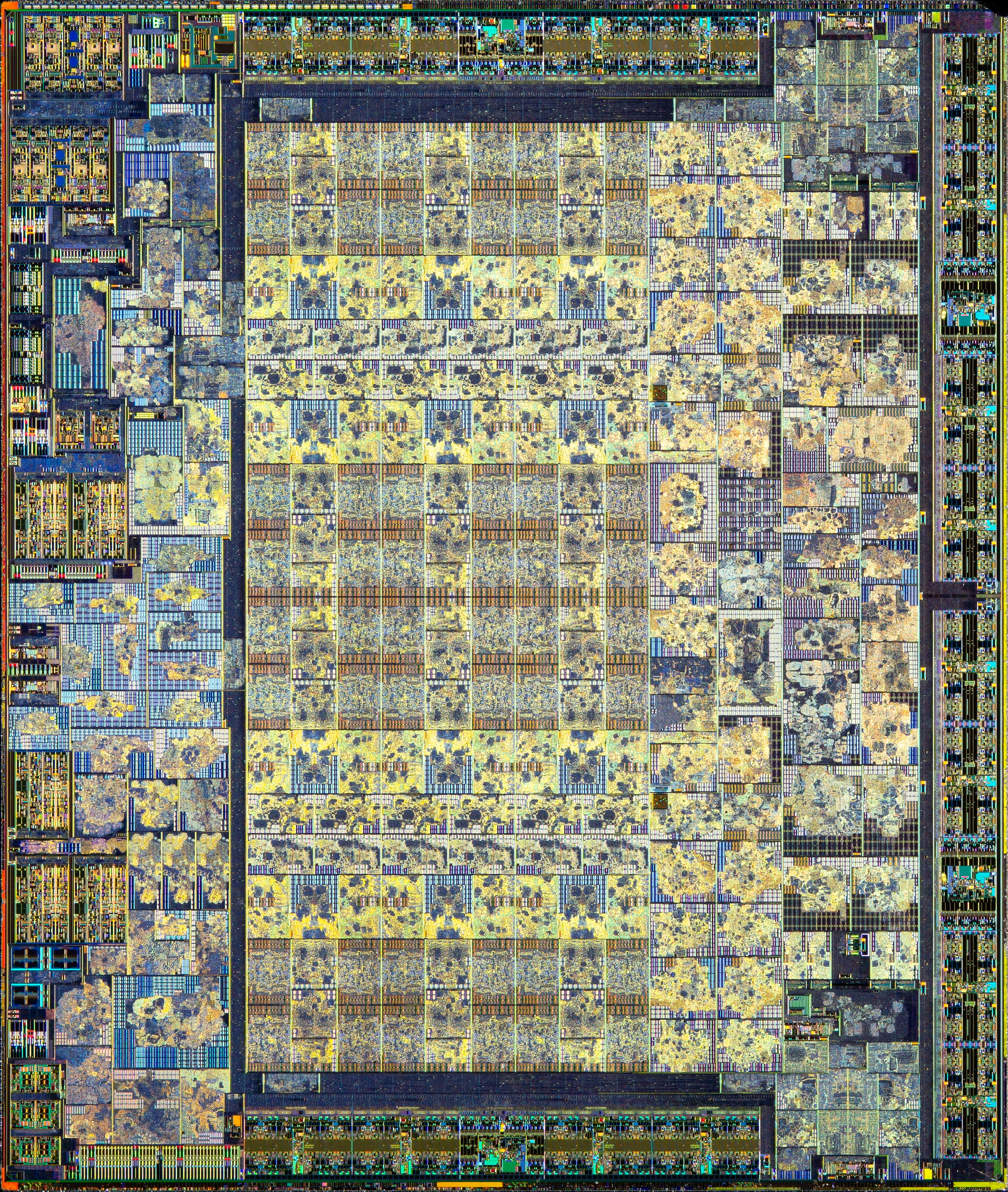
Die shot of the RX 5500 XT's RDNA GPU

The architecture features a new processor design, although the first details released at AMD's Computex keynote hints at aspects from the previous Graphics Core Next (GCN) architecture being present for backwards compatibility purposes, which is especially important for its use (in the form of RDNA 2) in the major ninth generation game consoles (the Xbox Series X/S and PlayStation 5) to preserve native compatibility with their pre-existing eighth generation game libraries designed for GCN. It features multi-level cache hierarchy and an improved rendering pipeline, with support for GDDR6 memory.

Starting with the architecture itself, one of the biggest changes for RDNA is the width of a wavefront, the fundamental group of work. GCN in all of its iterations was 64 threads wide, meaning 64 threads were bundled together into a single wavefront for execution. RDNA drops this to a native 32 threads wide. At the same time, AMD has expanded the width of their SIMDs from 16 slots to 32 (aka SIMD32), meaning the size of a wavefront now matches the SIMD size.

RDNA also introduces working primitive shaders. While the feature was present in the hardware of the Vega architecture, it was difficult to get a real-world performance boost from and thus AMD never enabled it. Primitive shaders in RDNA are compiler-controlled.

The display controller in RDNA has been updated to support Display Stream Compression 1.2a, allowing output in 4K@240 Hz, HDR 4K@120 Hz, and HDR 8K@60 Hz.

=== Differences between GCN and RDNA ===
There are architectural changes which affect how code is scheduled:

1. Single cycle instruction issue:
  - GCN issued one instruction per wave once every 4 cycles.
  - RDNA issues instructions every cycle.
2. Wave32:
  - GCN used a wavefront size of 64 threads (work items).
  - RDNA supports both wavefront sizes of 32 and 64 threads.
3. Workgroup Processors:
  - GCN grouped the shader hardware into "compute units" (CUs) which contained scalar ALUs and vector ALUs, LDS and memory access. One CU contains 4 SIMD16s which share one path to memory.
  - RDNA introduced the "workgroup processor" ("WGP"). The WGP replaces the compute unit as the basic unit of shader computation hardware/computing. One WGP encompasses 2 CUs. This allows significantly more compute power and memory bandwidth to be directed at a single workgroup.

=== Chips ===
Discrete GPUs:

- Navi 10 found on Radeon RX 5600, Radeon RX 5600 XT, Radeon RX 5600M, Radeon RX 5700, Radeon RX 5700M, Radeon RX 5700 XT, Radeon Pro 5700, Radeon Pro 5700 XT, Radeon Pro W5700X, and Radeon Pro W5700 graphics cards
- Navi 12 found on Radeon Pro V520 branded graphics card, Radeon Pro 5600M branded mobile graphics card and BC-160 mining card for cryptocurrency
- Navi 14 found on Radeon RX 5300, Radeon RX 5300 XT, Radeon Pro 5300, Radeon Pro W5300, Radeon RX 5500, Radeon RX 5500 XT, Radeon Pro 5500, Radeon Pro 5500 XT, and Radeon Pro W5500, branded graphics cards; Radeon RX 5300M, Radeon Pro 5300M, Radeon Pro W5300M, Radeon RX 5500M, Radeon Pro 5500M, and Radeon Pro W5500M branded mobile graphics cards

== RDNA 2 ==
AMD RDNA 2
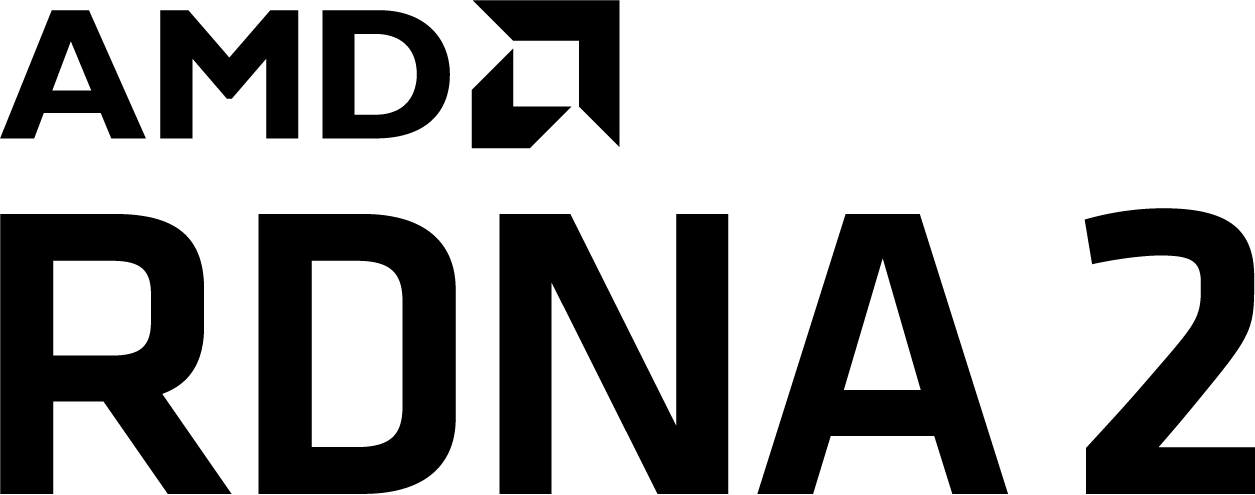
- Release date: November 18, 2020 (5 years ago)
- Codename: Navi 2x
- Fabrication process: TSMC N7; TSMC N6

History
- Predecessor: RDNA 1
- Successor: RDNA 3

Support status
- Supported

RDNA 2 (also RDNA2) is the successor to the RDNA microarchitecture. It was first publicly announced in early 2020 with a projected release in Q4 2020. According to statements from AMD, RDNA 2 would be a "refresh" of the RDNA architecture.

More information about RDNA 2 was made public on AMD's Financial Analyst Day on March 5, 2020. AMD claimed that it would provide a 50% performance-per-watt improvement over RDNA, with increases in clock speed and instructions-per-clock. Additional features confirmed by AMD include real-time, hardware accelerated ray tracing, "Infinity Cache", mesh shaders, sampler feedback and variable rate shading. The company announced that RDNA 2 would be used in next-generation gaming consoles and PC graphics cards code-named "Navi 2X" and also nicknamed as "Big Navi".

AMD unveiled the Radeon RX 6000 series, its next-gen RDNA 2 graphics cards at an online event on October 28, 2020. The lineup initially consisted of the RX 6800, RX 6800 XT and RX 6900 XT. The RX 6800 and 6800 XT launched on November 18, 2020, with the RX 6900 XT being released on December 8, 2020. Further variants including a Radeon RX 6700 (XT) series based on Navi 22, later launched on March 18, 2021.

On May 31, 2021, AMD launched the RX 6000M series of GPUs designed for laptops. These include the RX 6600M, RX 6700M, and RX 6800M. These were made available beginning on June 1, 2021.

On June 1, 2021, AMD's CEO Dr. Lisa Su and Tesla, Inc.'s CEO Elon Musk confirmed that the entertainment systems of Tesla's new Model S and Model X are powered by RDNA 2. The same microarchitecture was also announced to be used for an upcoming flagship Samsung Exynos SoC, later introduced in January 2022 as Exynos 2200, utilizing a custom Xclipse 920 GPU with 3 workgroup processors.

An RDNA 2 integrated GPU with 2 compute units is included in the I/O die on AMD's Zen 4-based Ryzen 7000 Series CPUs. According to AMD, the integrated RDNA 2 graphics in Ryzen 7000 are not intended for gaming and is instead intended for diagnostic purposes and offering video encode and decode capabilities.

=== Chips ===
Discrete GPUs:

- Navi 21
- Navi 22
- Navi 23
- Navi 24

Integrated into APUs/CPUs:

- Rembrandt (as "Radeon 660M" and "Radeon 680M" models found on Ryzen 6000 series mobile APUs)
- Raphael (as "Radeon Graphics" branded iGPU found on Ryzen 7000 series desktop CPUs)
- Mendocino (as "Radeon 610M" model found on Ryzen 7020 series mobile APUs)
- Rembrandt-R (as "Radeon 660M" and "Radeon 680M" models found on Ryzen 7035 series mobile APUs)
- Dragon Range (as "Radeon 610M" model found on Ryzen 7045 series mobile APUs)

=== Usage in video game consoles ===
Custom configurations of the RDNA 2 graphics microarchitecture are used in the PlayStation 5 from Sony, Xbox Series X and Series S consoles from Microsoft, with proprietary tweaks and different GPU modifications in each system's implementation. Valve announced on July 15, 2021, that their Steam Deck would feature the RDNA 2 architecture. The Steam Deck was released in February 2022.

== RDNA 3 ==
AMD RDNA 3
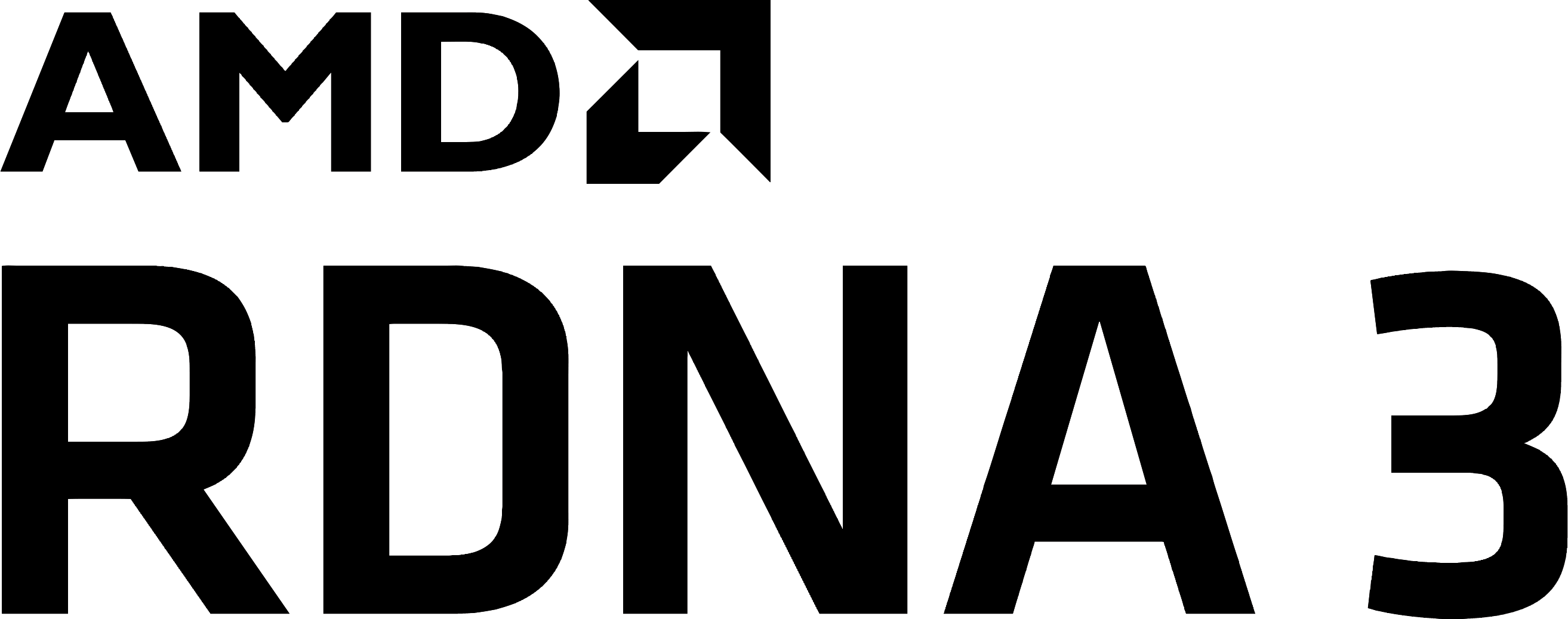
- Release date: December 13, 2022 (3 years ago)
- Codename: Navi 3x
- Fabrication process: TSMC N6; TSMC N5; TSMC N4

History
- Predecessor: RDNA 2
- Successor: RDNA 4

Support status
- Supported

RDNA 3 (also RDNA3) is the successor to the RDNA 2 microarchitecture and was projected for a launch in Q4 2022 per AMD's gaming GPU roadmap. At an August 29 reveal event for Ryzen 7000 series CPUs, AMD CEO Lisa Su teased RDNA 3 and revealed that it would utilize chiplets built on TSMC's N5 node. On September 19, 2022, Sam Naffziger, the current senior vice president at AMD, stated in a blogpost that improvements made to the RDNA 3 microarchitecture allow for considerable performance gains and efficiency, with an estimated 50% increase in performance-per-watt compared to the RDNA 2 microarchitecture. Additionally, the RDNA 3 architecture features the next generation of Infinity Cache, a modified graphics pipeline, adaptive power management and rearchitected compute units, leading to an overall robust uplift in rasterization and ray-tracing performance over the previous consumer architecture.

On November 3, 2022, AMD unveiled the RX 7900 XTX and RX 7900 XT graphics cards, based on the RDNA 3 microarchitecture. These are the first commercial GPUs to be based on multi-chip module (MCM) design.

On October 5, 2023, and October 24, 2024, respectively, Samsung announced Exynos 2400 and Exynos 1580, which utilized RDNA 3 microarchitecture-based custom-design GPU, Xclipse 940 and 540.

=== Chips ===
Discrete GPUs:

- Navi 31 found on Radeon RX 7900 GRE, Radeon RX 7900 XT, Radeon RX 7900 XTX, Radeon Pro W7800 and Radeon Pro W7900 branded graphics cards; Radeon RX 7900M branded mobile graphics cards
- Navi 32 found on Radeon RX 7700 XT and Radeon RX 7800 XT branded graphics cards
- Navi 33 found on Radeon RX 7600, Radeon RX 7600 XT, Radeon Pro W7500 and Radeon Pro W7600 branded graphics cards; Radeon RX 7600S, Radeon RX 7600M, Radeon RX 7600M XT and Radeon RX 7700S branded mobile graphics cards

Integrated into APUs/CPUs:

- Phoenix (as "Radeon 740M", "Radeon 760M" and "Radeon 780M" models found on Ryzen 7040 series and Ryzen Z1 series mobile APUs)
- Hawk Point (as "Radeon 740M", "Radeon 760M" and "Radeon 780M" models found on Ryzen 8040 series mobile APUs)

== RDNA 4 ==
AMD RDNA 4
- Release date: March 6, 2025 (20 months ago)
- Codename: Navi 4x
- Fabrication process: TSMC N4

History
- Predecessor: RDNA 3

Support status
- Supported

RDNA 4 is the successor to RDNA 3 and was targeted to be launched in early 2025. RDNA 4 features 3rd generation ray-tracing cores and 2nd generation AI accelerators. The first GPU models, the Radeon RX 9070 and RX 9070 XT, were announced on February 28, 2025.

=== Chips ===
Discrete GPUs:

- Navi 48 found on Radeon RX 9070 GRE, Radeon RX 9070 and Radeon RX 9070 XT branded graphics cards
- Navi 44 found on Radeon RX 9060 and Radeon RX 9060 XT branded graphics cards

== Comparison of RDNA chips ==
RDNA discrete GPU chips
Microarchitecture	RDNA 1			RDNA 2				RDNA 3			RDNA 4	
Chip	Navi 10	Navi 12	Navi 14	Navi 21	Navi 22	Navi 23	Navi 24	Navi 31	Navi 32	Navi 33	Navi 44	Navi 48
Code name	Gaming		Fighter	Sienna Cichlid	Navy Flounder	Dimgrey Cavefish	Beige Goby	Plum Bonito	Wheat Nas	Hotpink Bonefish		
LLVM target	gfx1010	gfx1011	gfx1012	gfx1030	gfx1031	gfx1032	gfx1034	gfx1100	gfx1101	gfx1102	gfx1200	gfx1201
Fab	TSMC N7						TSMC N6	TSMC N5 (GCD), TSMC N6 (MCD)		TSMC N6	TSMC N4	
Package	Monolithic							Multi-chip module (MCM)		Monolithic		
Die size (mm^{2})	251	Unknown	158	520	335	237	107	~531	~350	204	199	357
Graphics compute dies	—N/a							1		—N/a		
Memory cache dies	—N/a							6	4	—N/a		
GCD size (mm^{2})	—N/a							306	200	—N/a		
MCD size (mm^{2})	—N/a							37.5		—N/a		
Transistors (billions)	10.3	Unknown	6.4	26.8	17.2	11.06	5.4	57.7	28.1	13.3	29.7	53.9
Transistor density (MTr/mm^{2})	41.0	Unknown	40.5	51.5	51.3	46.7	50.5	109.2 (MCM); 132.4 (GCD)	81.2	65.2	149.2	151
Shader engines	2		1	4	2		1	6	TBA	2		4
Shader arrays	4		2	8	4		2	12	TBA	4		8
Workgroup processors	20		12	40	20	16	8	48	30	16		32
Compute units	40		24	80	40	32	16	96	60	32		64
Stream processors	2560		1536	5120	2560	2048	1024	6144	3840	2048		4096
Texture mapping units	160		96	320	160	128	64	384	240	128		256
Render output units	64		32	128	64		32	192	96	64		128
RT accelerators	—N/a			80	40	32	16	96	60	32		64
AI accelerators (Note: GPU matrix-multiplication units, not to be confused with the XDNA NPU.)	—N/a							192	120	64		128
L0 cache (KB)	32 per Workgroup processor (WGP)							64 per WGP				
L1 cache (KB)	128 per Shader array (SA)							256 per SA			128 per SA	
L2 cache (MB)	8	4	2	4	3	2	1	6	4	2	4	8
L3 cache (MB)	—N/a			128	96	32	16	96	64	32		64
Memory type	GDDR6	HBM2	GDDR6									
Memory bus (bits)	256	2048	128	256	192	128	64	384	256	128		256
Display Core Next	2.0.0			3.0.0		3.0.2	3.0.3	3.2.0		3.2.1	4.0.1	
Video Core Next	2.0.0	2.0.2		3.0.0		3.0.16	3.0.33	4.0.0		4.0.4	5.0.0	
Launch	Jul 2019	Jun 2020	Oct 2019	Nov 2020	Mar 2021	May 2021	Jan 2022	Dec 2022	Sep 2023	Jan 2023	Jun 2025	Mar 2025
Introduced with	RX 5700 (XT)	Pro 5600M	RX 5500; RX 5500M	RX 6800 (XT)	RX 6700 XT	RX 6600M	RX 6300M; RX 6500M	RX 7900 XT(X)	RX 7700 XT; RX 7800 XT	RX 7600S; RX 7600M (XT); RX 7700S	RX 9060 XT	RX 9070 (XT)

RDNA integrated GPU chips
Microarchitecture	RDNA 2					RDNA 3		RDNA 3.5		
Code name	Rembrandt	Raphael	Mendocino	Rembrandt-R	Dragon Range	Phoenix	Hawk Point	Strix Point	Strix Halo	Krackan Point
LLVM target	gfx1035	gfx1036	gfx1037	gfx1035	gfx1037	gfx1103		gfx115{0,1}	gfx1151	gfx1152
Fab	TSMC N6							TSMC N4		
Package	Monolithic							Monolithic (Note: Everything (including CPU) on one die)	Semi-MCM (Note: GPU integrated into IO die; CPU cores on two dies)	Monolithic
Die size (mm^{2})								TBA	308	TBA
Transistors (billions)								TBA		
Transistor density (MTr/mm^{2})								TBA		
Shader engines										
Shader arrays										
Workgroup processors								8	20	4
Compute units								16	40	8
Stream processors								1024	2560	512
Texture mapping units								64	160	32
Render output units								32	64	8
RT accelerators								16	40	8
AI accelerators (Note: GPU matrix-multiplication units, not to be confused with the XDNA NPU.)								32	80	16
L0 cache (KB)	32 per Workgroup processor (WGP)					64 per WGP				
L1 cache (KB)	128 per Shader array (SA)					256 per SA				
L2 cache (MB)								2	8	1
L3 cache (MB)								0	32 (Note: MALL cache is dedicated to GPU)	0
Memory type	DDR5/LPDDR5	DDR5	LPDDR5	DDR5/LPDDR5	DDR5	DDR5/LPDDR5(X)				
Memory bus (bits) (Note: Dual-channel DDR5 provides 2*64=128 bits of width.)	128					128		128	128/256	128
Display Core Next								3.1.4	3.5.0	3.5.0
Video Core Next								4.0.2	4.0.5	4.0.5
Launch	Jan 2022	Sep 2022		Jan 2023			Dec 2023	Jul 2024	Jan 2025	Mar 2025
Introduced with	660M; 680M	Radeon; Graphics	610M	660M; 680M	610M	740M; 760M; 780M	740M; 760M; 780M	880M; 890M	8040S; 8050S; 8060S	860M

== See also ==
- CDNA (microarchitecture)
- List of AMD graphics processing units
- AMD Radeon Software
- GPUOpen
- ROCm
