= Steam (disambiguation) =

Steam is vaporized water.

Steam or STEAM may also refer to:

== Science and technology ==
- Steam (service), a software distribution platform by Valve
- Steam engine, a heat engine that performs mechanical work using steam as its working fluid.
- Serial time-encoded amplified microscopy, an optical imaging method
- Stimulated echo acquisition mode, a type of nuclear magnetic resonance spectroscopy
- Science, technology, engineering, art, and mathematics, an education model

== Arts and entertainment ==
- Code Name: S.T.E.A.M., a 2015 video game

=== Music ===
- Steam (band), an American pop-rock group
- Steam (Archie Shepp album), 1976
- Steam (East 17 album), 1994
  - "Steam" (East 17 song), 1994
- Steam (Ty Herndon album), 1999
  - "Steam" (Ty Herndon song), 1999
- "Steam" (Peter Gabriel song), 1992

=== Film and television ===
- Steam, a 1945 short documentary film, director James E. Rogers, music Clifton Parker
- Steam (film), a 2007 American film
- Steam: The Turkish Bath, a 1997 Italian-Turkish-Spanish film
- Steam, a station ident for British television channel BBC Two from the 1991–2001 idents
- "S.T.E.A.M.", a 2009 episode of the American superhero animated television series Transformers: Animated

== Sports ==
- Summerland Steam, a Canadian ice hockey team in Summerland, British Columbia

=== United States ===
- Atlanta Steam, a women's American football team in Atlanta, Georgia
- Chicago Steam, an American Basketball Association team in Chicago, Illinois
- Lehigh Valley Steam, a soccer club in Lehigh Valley, Pennsylvania
- Queen City Steam, an ice hockey team in Evendale, Ohio
- Roanoke Steam, an arena football team in Roanoke, Virginia

== Organizations ==
- STEAM – Museum of the Great Western Railway, Swindon, England
- Steam Brewing Company, a New Zealand microbrewery

== Other uses ==
- Steam (poker), a mental state that adversely affects one's play
- Steam Deck, a handheld gaming computer.
- Steaming, a cooking method

== See also ==
- Steam power
- Steam turbine
- Steamed Hams
- Steampunk (disambiguation)
- Steamer (disambiguation)
- Steaming (disambiguation)
