= Radeon RX 6000 series =

Series of video cards by AMD

AMD Radeon RX 6000 series
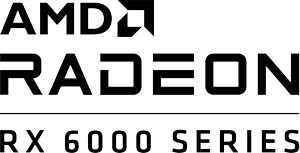
- Release date: November 18, 2020; 5 years ago
- Codename: Navi 2x (nicknamed "Big Navi")
- Architecture: RDNA 2
- Transistors: 5.4B (Navi 24) 6 nm; 11.06B (Navi 23) 7 nm; 17.2B (Navi 22) 7 nm; 26.8B (Navi 21) 7 nm
- Fabrication process: TSMC N7 (FinFET); TSMC N6 (FinFET)

Cards
- Entry-level: Radeon RX 6300M; Radeon RX 6400; Radeon RX 6450M; Radeon RX 6500M
- Mid-range: Radeon RX 6500 XT; Radeon RX 6550S; Radeon RX 6550M; Radeon RX 6600S; Radeon RX 6600M; Radeon RX 6600; Radeon RX 6600 XT; Radeon RX 6650M; Radeon RX 6650M XT; Radeon RX 6650 XT
- High-end: Radeon RX 6700S; Radeon RX 6700M; Radeon RX 6700; Radeon RX 6700 XT; Radeon RX 6750 GRE; Radeon RX 6750 XT; Radeon RX 6800S; Radeon RX 6800M; Radeon RX 6800; Radeon RX 6800 XT; Radeon RX 6850M XT
- Enthusiast: Radeon RX 6900 XT; Radeon RX 6950 XT

API support
- Direct3D: Direct3D 12.0 Ultimate (feature level 12_2); Shader Model 6.7
- OpenCL: OpenCL 2.1
- OpenGL: OpenGL 4.6
- Vulkan: Vulkan 1.3; SPIR-V

History
- Predecessor: Radeon RX 5000 series
- Successor: Radeon RX 7000 series

Support status
- Supported

The Radeon RX 6000 series is a series of graphics processing units developed by AMD, based on their RDNA 2 architecture. It was announced on October 28, 2020 and is the successor to the Radeon RX 5000 series. It consists of the entry-level RX 6400, mid-range RX 6500 XT, RX 6600, RX 6600 XT, RX 6650 XT, high-end RX 6700, RX 6700 XT, RX 6750 XT, RX 6800, RX 6800 XT, and enthusiast RX 6900 XT and RX 6950 XT for desktop computers; and the RX 6600M, RX 6700M, and RX 6800M for laptops. A sub-series for mobile, Radeon RX 6000S (consisting of RX 6600S, RX 6700S, and RX 6800S), was announced in CES 2022, targeting thin and light laptop designs.

The series is designed to compete with Nvidia's GeForce 30 series and Intel's Arc Alchemist series of cards. It is also the first generation of AMD GPUs that supports hardware accelerated real-time ray tracing, variable-rate shading and mesh shaders.

== History ==
On September 14, 2020, AMD hinted at the physical design of its RX 6000 series through a tweet shared on social messaging service Twitter. At the same time, it launched a virtual island inside the video game Fortnite containing a large-scale rendition of the RX 6000 hardware design, which players could freely explore using the game's Creative mode.

AMD officially unveiled the first three cards, the RX 6800, RX 6800 XT, and RX 6900 XT, in an event titled "Where Gaming Begins: Ep. 2" on October 28. In the event, they announced the RX 6800 XT as its flagship graphics processor, comparing its performance to that of Nvidia's RTX 3080 graphics card in 1440p and 4K resolution gaming. The 6800 XT was announced with a price tag of $649 USD, $50 lower than the RTX 3080's starting price of $699. They then introduced the RX 6800 as a competitor to Nvidia's previous-generation RTX 2080 Ti, priced at $579 compared to the 2080 Ti's $999; and the RX 6900 XT as its top card, claiming performance comparable with Nvidia's RTX 3090, but with lower power consumption and a launch price of $999, $500 cheaper than the 3090.

The Radeon RX 6800 and 6800 XT were released on November 18, 2020, and the RX 6900 XT was released on December 8, 2020.

On February 3, 2021, Gigabyte registered a range of RX 6700 XT graphics cards with the Eurasian Economic Commission (EEC), with the filing indicating that all seven would ship with 12 GB of memory. On March 3, 2021, AMD officially announced the RX 6700 XT card, set to compete with Nvidia's RTX 3060 Ti and 3070 cards. It launched on March 18, 2021.

On May 31, 2021, AMD announced the RX 6000M series of GPUs designed for laptops, including the RX 6600M, RX 6700M, and RX 6800M. They became available on June 1.

On June 23, Gigabyte registered six RX 6600 XT graphics cards with the EEC, indicating they would all have 8 GB of memory. This was just over a month after ASRock made similar filings for both the RX 6600 and 6600 XT, each with 8 GB of memory. On July 5, VideoCardz discovered that Taiwanese graphics card retailer PowerColor had already created product pages for the unannounced Radeon 6600 and 6600 XT GPUs.

On July 30, AMD announced the RX 6600 and 6600 XT GPUs, which were released on August 11, 2021. The RX 6600 XT is available for US$379 MSRP.

In early 2022, AMD announced the low-end SKUs of the 6000 series; the RX 6400 and RX 6500 XT. These cards support only 4 PCIe lanes (albeit at PCIe 4.0 speeds), which can bottleneck performance on low-end machines lacking PCIe 4.0. They also lack GPU-accelerated video encoding features offered by the higher-end models.

== Availability issues ==
Much like Nvidia's competing GeForce 30 series, releases sold out almost immediately due to a combination of low stock and scalping bots.

=== RX 6800 and 6800 XT ===
The RX 6800 and 6800 XT were launched on November 18, 2020, but due to low stock availability, sold out at most retailers that day. American retailer Micro Center restricted sales to in-store only, claiming that stock "will be extremely limited at launch". PCMag reported that both cards on Newegg sold out as early as 6:05 a.m. PST, and that they were unavailable on AMD's own store website by 6:11 a.m. Retailer B&H Photo Video refused to accept orders for the cards, stating in part, "We do not know and are therefore unable to provide a date or time for when these items will become available to purchase."

Scalpers were reportedly reselling the GPUs on eBay for around US$1000–1500, roughly double the launch price. Frustrated social media users tried to derail the listings by using bots to make fake bids on the scalped GPUs at absurd prices; in one instance, an auction for an RX 6800 XT saw bids as high as US$70,000.

=== RX 6900 XT ===
The RX 6900 XT was launched on December 8, 2020, and similarly to the RX 6800 and 6800 XT, it sold out on the same day it was released. According to PCMag, it was listed as out of stock on Newegg by 6:02 a.m. PST, just two minutes after it went on sale. AMD's store website, struggling to keep up with the high number of visitors, kept displaying 503 Service Temporarily Unavailable errors to customers attempting to buy the graphics card; by 6:35 a.m., it was sold out.

== Radeon RX 6000 series features ==
Features of the AMD Radeon RX 6000 series:

- RDNA 2 microarchitecture
- New TSMC N7 manufacturing process
- New TSMC N6 manufacturing process for RX 6500 and RX 6400
- DirectX 12 Ultimate support
- Added L3 cache (branded as Infinity Cache), up to 128 MB
- GDDR6 memory
- PCIe gen 4 interface
- Added ray-tracing support with RT cores
- AV1 video decoding support (except for Navi 24 products)
- Added Resizable BAR functionality
- DisplayPort 1.4a
- HDMI 2.1 support

== Products ==
=== Desktop ===
Model (Code name)	Release Date & Price	Architecture & fab	Transistors & die size	Core		Fillrate (Note: Boost values (if available) are stated below the base value in italic.) (Note: Texture fillrate is calculated as the number of Texture Mapping Units multiplied by the base (or boost) core clock speed.) (Note: Pixel fillrate is calculated as the number of Render Output Units multiplied by the base (or boost) core clock speed.)		Processing power (Note: Precision performance is calculated from the base (or boost) core clock speed based on a FMA operation.) (GFLOPS)			Infinity Cache		Memory				TBP	Bus interface
Model (Code name)	Release Date & Price	Architecture & fab	Transistors & die size	Config (Note: Unified shaders : Texture mapping units : Render output units : Ray accelerators and Compute units (CU))	Clock (MHz)	Texture (GT/s)	Pixel (GP/s)	Half	Single	Double	Size	Bandwidth (GB/s)	Size	Bandwidth (GB/s)	Bus type & width	Clock (MT/s)	TBP	Bus interface
Radeon RX 6300 (Navi 24) (Note: Navi 24 lacks hardware video encoder.)	Jan 4, 2022 (Note: Actual release date unknown; RX 6300M release date is listed instead.); OEM	RDNA 2 TSMC N6	5.4×10^{9} 107 mm^{2}	768:48:32:12; 12 CU	1000; 2040	48; 97.9	32; 65.3	3,072; 6,267	1536; 3,133	96; 195.8	8 MB	104	2 GB	64	GDDR6; 32-bit	16000	32 W	PCIe 4.0 ×4
Radeon RX 6400 (Navi 24)	Jan 19, 2022 $159 USD	RDNA 2 TSMC N6	5.4×10^{9} 107 mm^{2}	768:48:32:12; 12 CU	1923; 2321	92.3; 111.4	61.5; 74.3	5,907; 7,130	2,954; 3,565	184.6; 222.8	16 MB	208	4 GB	128	GDDR6; 64-bit	16000	53 W	PCIe 4.0 ×4
Radeon RX 6500 XT (Navi 24)	Jan 19, 2022 $199 USD (4GB) $219 USD (8GB)	RDNA 2 TSMC N6	5.4×10^{9} 107 mm^{2}	1024:64:32:16; 16 CU	2310; 2815	147.8; 180.2	73.9; 90.1	9,462; 11,530	4,731; 5,765	295.6; 360.3	16 MB	232	4 GB; 8 GB	144	GDDR6; 64-bit	18000	107 W 113 W	PCIe 4.0 ×4
Radeon RX 6600 (Navi 23)	Oct 13, 2021 $329 USD	RDNA 2 TSMC N7	11.06×10^{9} 237 mm^{2}	1792:112:64:28; 28 CU	1626; 2491	182.3; 279	104.1; 159.4	11,658; 17,860	5,828; 8,928	364.2; 558	32 MB	412.9	8 GB	224	GDDR6; 128-bit	14000	132 W	PCIe 4.0 ×8
Radeon RX 6600 XT (Navi 23)	Aug 11, 2021 $379 USD	RDNA 2 TSMC N7	11.06×10^{9} 237 mm^{2}	2048:128:64:32; 32 CU	1968; 2589	251.9; 331.4	126; 165.7	16,122; 21,209	8,061; 10,605	503.8; 662.8	32 MB	444.9	8 GB	256	GDDR6; 128-bit	16000	160 W	PCIe 4.0 ×8
Radeon RX 6650 XT (Navi 23)	May 10, 2022 $399 USD	RDNA 2 TSMC N7	11.06×10^{9} 237 mm^{2}	2048:128:64:32; 32 CU	2055; 2635	263; 337.2	131.5; 168.6	16,835; 21,586	8,417; 10,793	526.1; 674.6	32 MB	468.9	8 GB	280	GDDR6; 128-bit	17500	180 W	PCIe 4.0 ×8
Radeon RX 6700 (Navi 22)	Jun 9, 2021	RDNA 2 TSMC N7	17.2×10^{9} 335 mm^{2}	2304:144:64:36; 36 CU	1941; 2450	279.5; 352.8	124.2; 156.8	17,888; 22,579	8,944; 11,290	559; 705.6	80 MB	1065	10 GB	320	GDDR6; 160-bit	16000	175 W	PCIe 4.0 ×16
Radeon RX 6750 GRE 10GB (Navi 22)	Oct 18, 2023 $269 USD	RDNA 2 TSMC N7	17.2×10^{9} 335 mm^{2}	2304:144:64:36; 36 CU	1941; 2450	279.5; 352.8	124.2; 156.8	17,888; 22,579	8,944; 11,290	559; 705.6	80 MB	1065	10 GB	320	GDDR6; 160-bit	16000	170 W	PCIe 4.0 ×16
Radeon RX 6700 XT (Navi 22)	Mar 18, 2021 $479 USD	RDNA 2 TSMC N7	17.2×10^{9} 335 mm^{2}	2560:160:64:40; 40 CU	2321; 2581	371.4; 413	148.5; 165.2	23,767; 26,429	11,884; 13,215	742.7; 825.9	96 MB	1278	12 GB	384	GDDR6; 192-bit	16000	230 W	PCIe 4.0 ×16
Radeon RX 6750 GRE 12GB (Navi 22)	Oct 18, 2023 $289 USD	RDNA 2 TSMC N7	17.2×10^{9} 335 mm^{2}	2560:160:64:40; 40 CU	2321; 2581	371.4; 413	148.5; 165.2	23,767; 26,429	11,884; 13,215	742.7; 825.9	96 MB	1278	12 GB	384	GDDR6; 192-bit	16000	230 W	PCIe 4.0 ×16
Radeon RX 6750 XT (Navi 22)	May 10, 2022 $549 USD	RDNA 2 TSMC N7	17.2×10^{9} 335 mm^{2}	2560:160:64:40; 40 CU	2150; 2600	344; 416	137.6; 166.4	22,016; 26,624	11,008; 13,312	688; 832	96 MB	1326	12 GB	432	GDDR6; 192-bit	18000	250 W	PCIe 4.0 ×16
Radeon RX 6800 (Navi 21)	Nov 18, 2020 $579 USD	RDNA 2 TSMC N7	26.8×10^{9} 520 mm^{2}	3840:240:96:60; 60 CU	1700; 2105	408; 505.2	163.2; 202.1	26,112; 32,333	13,056; 16,166	816; 1,010	128 MB	1432.6	16 GB	512	GDDR6; 256-bit	16000	250 W	PCIe 4.0 ×16
Radeon RX 6800 XT (Navi 21)	Nov 18, 2020 $649 USD	RDNA 2 TSMC N7	26.8×10^{9} 520 mm^{2}	4608:288:128:72; 72 CU	1825; 2250	525.6; 648	233.6; 288	33,638; 41,472	16,819; 20,736	1,051; 1,296	128 MB	1664.2	16 GB	512	GDDR6; 256-bit	16000	300 W	PCIe 4.0 ×16
Radeon RX 6900 XT (Navi 21)	Dec 8, 2020 $999 USD	RDNA 2 TSMC N7	26.8×10^{9} 520 mm^{2}	5120:320:128:80; 80 CU	1825; 2250	584; 720	233.6; 288	37,376; 46,080	18,688; 23,040	1,168; 1,440	128 MB	1664.2	16 GB	512	GDDR6; 256-bit	16000	300 W	PCIe 4.0 ×16
Radeon RX 6950 XT (Navi 21)	May 10, 2022 $1,099 USD	RDNA 2 TSMC N7	26.8×10^{9} 520 mm^{2}	5120:320:128:80; 80 CU	1890; 2310	604.8; 739.2	241.9; 295.7	38,707; 47,309	19,354; 23,654	1,210; 1,478	128 MB	1793.5	16 GB	576	GDDR6; 256-bit	18000	335 W	PCIe 4.0 ×16

=== Mobile ===
Model (Code name)	Release date	Architecture & fab	Transistors & die size	Core		Fillrate (Note: Boost values (if available) are stated below the base value in italic.) (Note: Texture fillrate is calculated as the number of Texture Mapping Units multiplied by the base (or boost) core clock speed.) (Note: Pixel fillrate is calculated as the number of Render Output Units multiplied by the base (or boost) core clock speed.)		Processing power (Note: Precision performance is calculated from the base (or boost) core clock speed based on a FMA operation.) (GFLOPS)			Infinity Cache	Memory				HW Decoder			HW Encoder			TDP	Bus interface
Model (Code name)	Release date	Architecture & fab	Transistors & die size	Config (Note: Unified shaders : Texture mapping units : Render output units : Ray accelerators and Compute units CU)	Clock (MHz)	Texture (GT/s)	Pixel (GP/s)	Half	Single	Double	Infinity Cache	Size	Bandwidth (GB/s)	Bus type & width	Clock (MT/s)	AV1	H265	4K H264	AV1	H265	4K H264	TDP	Bus interface
Radeon RX 6300M (Navi 24) (Note: Lacks hardware video encoder.)	Jan 4, 2022	RDNA 2 TSMC N6	5.4×10^{9} 107 mm^{2}	768:64:32:12; 12 CU	1512	97.76	48.38	6,270	3,130	195.6	8 MB	2 GB	64	GDDR6; 32-bit	16000	No	Yes	Yes	No	No	No	25 W	PCIe 4.0 ×4
Radeon RX 6450M (Navi 24)	Jan 4, 2023	RDNA 2 TSMC N6	5.4×10^{9} 107 mm^{2}	768:64:32:12; 12 CU	2220	118.10	71.04	7,600	3,780	236.3	16 MB	4 GB	128	GDDR6; 64-bit	16000	No	Yes	Yes	No	No	No	50 W	PCIe 4.0 ×4
Radeon RX 6550S (Navi 24)	Jan 4, 2023	RDNA 2 TSMC N6	5.4×10^{9} 107 mm^{2}	1024:64:32:16; 16 CU	2170	154.20	69.44	9,900	4,900	306.3	16 MB	4 GB	128	GDDR6; 64-bit	16000	No	Yes	Yes	No	No	No	50 W	PCIe 4.0 ×4
Radeon RX 6500M (Navi 24)	Jan 4, 2022	RDNA 2 TSMC N6	5.4×10^{9} 107 mm^{2}	1024:64:32:16; 16 CU	2191	155.7	70.11	9,970	4,980	311.2	16 MB	4 GB	128	GDDR6; 64-bit	16000	No	Yes	Yes	No	No	No	50 W	PCIe 4.0 ×4
Radeon RX 6550M (Navi 24)	Jan 4, 2023	RDNA 2 TSMC N6	5.4×10^{9} 107 mm^{2}	1024:64:32:16; 16 CU	2560	182.10	81.92	11,600	5,800	362.5	16 MB	4 GB	144	GDDR6; 64-bit	18000	No	Yes	Yes	No	No	No	80 W	PCIe 4.0 ×4
Radeon RX 6600S (Navi 23)	Jan 4, 2022	RDNA 2 TSMC N7	11.06×10^{9} 237 mm^{2}	1792:128:64:28; 28 CU	1881	244.2	120.3	15,630	7,810	448.1	32 MB	4 GB	224	GDDR6; 128-bit	14000	Yes	Yes	Yes	No	Yes	Yes	80 W	PCIe 4.0 ×8
Radeon RX 6700S (Navi 23)	Jan 4, 2022	RDNA 2 TSMC N7	11.06×10^{9} 237 mm^{2}	1792:128:64:28; 28 CU	1890	247.5	120.9	15,840	7,920	495.0	32 MB	8 GB	224	GDDR6; 128-bit	14000	Yes	Yes	Yes	No	Yes	Yes	80 W	PCIe 4.0 ×8
Radeon RX 6600M (Navi 23)	May 31, 2021	RDNA 2 TSMC N7	11.06×10^{9} 237 mm^{2}	1792:128:64:28; 28 CU	2177	274.2	139.3	17,550	7,800	487.5	32 MB	8 GB	224	GDDR6; 128-bit	14000	Yes	Yes	Yes	No	Yes	Yes	100 W	PCIe 4.0 ×8
Radeon RX 6650M (Navi 23)	Jan 4, 2022	RDNA 2 TSMC N7	11.06×10^{9} 237 mm^{2}	1792:128:64:28; 28 CU	2222	276.6	139.3	17,700	8,850	553.1	32 MB	8 GB	256	GDDR6; 128-bit	16000	Yes	Yes	Yes	No	Yes	Yes	120 W	PCIe 4.0 ×8
Radeon RX 6800S (Navi 23)	Jan 4, 2022	RDNA 2 TSMC N7	11.06×10^{9} 237 mm^{2}	2048:128:64:32; 32 CU	1975	288.0	134.4	18,430	9,220	576.5	32 MB	8 GB	256	GDDR6; 128-bit	16000	Yes	Yes	Yes	No	Yes	Yes	100 W	PCIe 4.0 ×8
Radeon RX 6650M XT (Navi 23)	Jan 4, 2022	RDNA 2 TSMC N7	11.06×10^{9} 237 mm^{2}	2048:128:64:32; 32 CU	2162	311.5	142.2	19,940	9,970	623.1	32 MB	8 GB	256	GDDR6; 128-bit	16000	Yes	Yes	Yes	No	Yes	Yes	120 W	PCIe 4.0 ×8
Radeon RX 6700M (Navi 22)	May 31, 2021	RDNA 2 TSMC N7	17.2×10^{9} 335 mm^{2}	2304:144:64:36; 36 CU	2300	331.4	147.2	21,209	10,605	662.1	80 MB	10 GB	320	GDDR6; 160-bit	16000	Yes	Yes	Yes	No	Yes	Yes	135 W	PCIe 4.0 ×16
Radeon RX 6800M (Navi 22)	May 31, 2021	RDNA 2 TSMC N7	17.2×10^{9} 335 mm^{2}	2560:160:64:40; 40 CU	2300	368.0	147.2	23,550	11,780	736.2	96 MB	12 GB	384	GDDR6; 192-bit	16000	Yes	Yes	Yes	No	Yes	Yes	145+ W	PCIe 4.0 ×16
Radeon RX 6850M XT (Navi 22)	Jan 4, 2022	RDNA 2 TSMC N7	17.2×10^{9} 335 mm^{2}	2560:160:64:40; 40 CU	2580	415.6	157.6	26,430	13,209	825.6	96 MB	12 GB	432	GDDR6; 192-bit	18000	Yes	Yes	Yes	No	Yes	Yes	165 W	PCIe 4.0 ×16

== See also ==
- Radeon RX 5000 series
- Radeon RX 7000 series – AMD's successor to Radeon RX 6000 series (RDNA 3 based)
- Radeon RX 9000 series
- Radeon Pro
- AMD Instinct
- RDNA (microarchitecture)
- List of AMD graphics processing units
