= Anthony Coulls =

British museum curator and historian

Anthony Coulls (born 1974) a is a British museum curator and historian. He is the Senior Curator of Rail Transport and Technology at the National Railway Museum, the author of several books on railway and industrial history, and is active in the steam heritage movement.

== History ==
A graduate of firstly Aberystwyth University and then the Ironbridge Institute, Coulls began his museum career as a Collections Assistant at the National Railway Museum in 1997, moving to Leicestershire Museums in January 1999. Between 2001 and 2004, Coulls was the Curator of Energy at the Museum of Science and Industry in Manchester, moving in 2004 to become Collections Care Manager at Locomotion, The National Railway Museum at Shildon. In 2009 he was appointed the Senior Curator of Railway Vehicles at the National Railway Museum, and is now the Senior Curator of Rail Transport and Technology there, where he oversees the curation policy for the national collection of railway locomotives. He is an active railway preservationist, as Chairman of the Friends of Thorpe Light Railway, an advisor to the Sierra Leone National Railway Museum, and a mentor - and former trustee - of the Narrow Gauge Railway Museum Trust. He is an expert on the Lowca Engineering Works of Tulk and Ley and Fletcher, Jennings & Co.

In 2003, Coulls took on loan a 15-ton road roller, built in 1894 by Aveling and Porter, from Beamish Museum, which he subsequently restored to working order. He is a past general secretary of the Road Rollers Association and from 2015 to 2019 was Chairman of the National Traction Engine Trust. In 2019, Coulls was the Lead Curator for the Award-Winning exhibition of model steam locomotives at the National Railway Museum "Brass, Steel and Fire" which then moved on to the Science Museum, London in 2020, running to August 2021.

== Works ==
- Coulls, Anthony (15 April 2018). Narrow Gauge Locomotives. Amberley Publishing. ISBN 9781445675565.
- Coulls, Anthony (15 July 2018). Road Rollers. Amberley Publishing. ISBN 9781445675800.
- Coulls, Anthony (15 March 2019). Stationary Steam Engines. Amberley Publishing. ISBN 9781445691077.
- Coulls, Anthony (15 July 2019). The Slate Industry. Amberley Publishing. ISBN 9781445691053.
- Coulls, Anthony (15 July 2017). Traction Engines. Amberley Publishing. ISBN 9781445668864.
- Coulls, Anthony (July 2016). The Lowca Legacy. Holne Publishing.
- Coulls, Anthony (1 February 2012). Spirit of Locomotion: The National Railway Museum at Shildon. Spirit of Britain. Halsgrove. ISBN 9780857100641.
- Coulls, Anthony (July 2016). Sierra Leone Railway Adventure : The Remarkable Story of the Sierra Leone National Railway Museum. Holne Publishing. ISBN 9780956331779.
