= Radeon RX 7000 series =

Series of video cards by AMD

AMD Radeon RX 7000 series
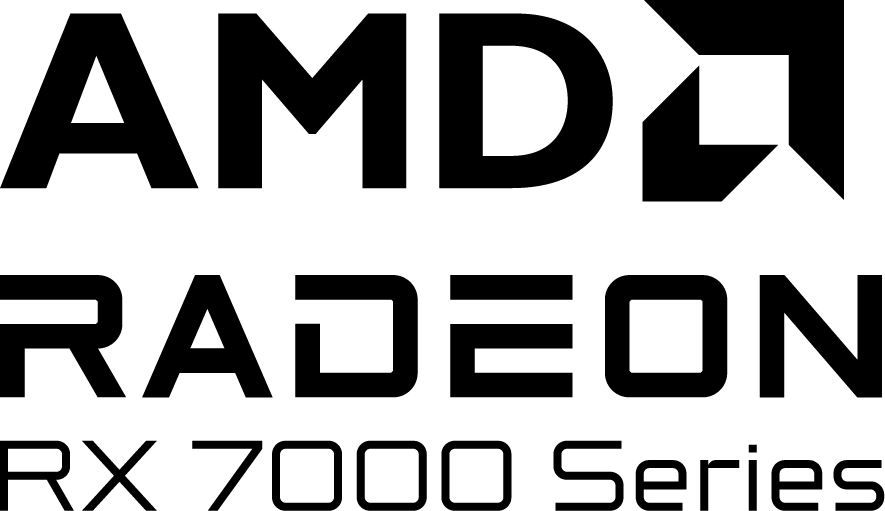
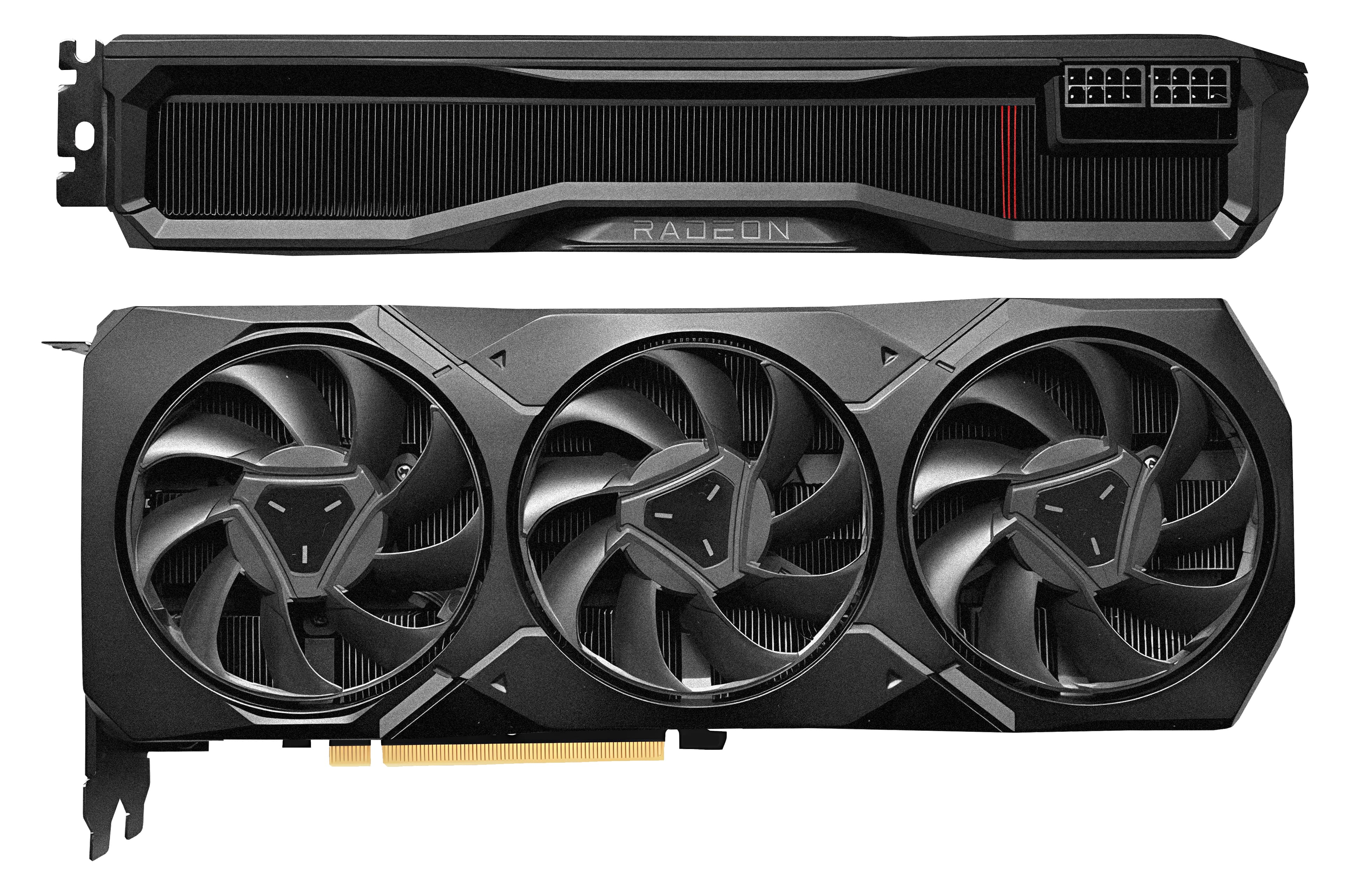
- An AMD Radeon RX 7900 XT
- Release date: December 13, 2022; 3 years ago
- Manufactured by: TSMC
- Designed by: AMD
- Marketed by: AMD
- Codename: Navi 3x
- Architecture: RDNA 3
- Cores: 28-96 Compute Units (CUs)
- Transistors: 57.7B (Navi 31 GCD); 28.1B (Navi 32 GCD); 13.3B (Navi 33); 2.05B (MCD)
- Fabrication process: TSMC N5 (GCD); TSMC N6 (Navi 33 and MCD)

Cards
- Entry-level: Radeon RX 7400; Radeon RX 7600S (laptop only); Radeon RX 7600M XT (laptop only); Radeon RX 7600; Radeon RX 7600 XT
- Mid-range: Radeon RX 7700S (laptop only); Radeon RX 7700 XT; Radeon RX 7800M (laptop only)
- High-end: Radeon RX 7900 XT; Radeon RX 7800 XT; Radeon RX 7900M (laptop only); Radeon RX 7900 GRE
- Enthusiast: Radeon RX 7900 XTX

API support
- Direct3D: Direct3D 12.0 Ultimate (feature level 12_2); Shader Model 6.8
- OpenCL: OpenCL 2.1
- OpenGL: OpenGL 4.6
- Vulkan: Vulkan 1.4

History
- Predecessor: Radeon RX 6000 series
- Variant: Radeon Pro W7000 series
- Successor: Radeon RX 9000 series

Support status
- Supported

The Radeon RX 7000 series is a series of graphics processing units developed by AMD, based on their RDNA 3 architecture. It was announced on November 3, 2022 and is the successor to the Radeon RX 6000 series. The first two graphics cards of the family (RX 7900 XT and RX 7900 XTX) were released on Dec 13, 2022. Currently AMD has announced and released eight desktop graphics cards of the Radeon RX 7000 series: the entry level RX 7400, RX 7600, and RX 7600 XT; the mainstream RX 7700 XT and RX 7800 XT; the high-end RX 7900 GRE; and the enthusiast RX 7900 XT and RX 7900 XTX. Four laptop chips have also been released in two series; the power efficiency targeting S series, consisting of the RX 7600S and RX 7700S; and the M series, consisting of the RX 7800M and RX 7900M.

== Features ==
- RDNA 3 microarchitecture
  - Up to 96 Compute Units (CU) compared to the maximum of 80 in the RX 6000 series
  - New dual-issue shader arithmetic logic units (ALUs) in each CU with the ability to execute two instructions per cycle
  - Second-generation Ray tracing accelerators
  - Acceleration of AI inference tasks with Wave matrix multiply-accumulate (WMMA) instructions on FP16, non-matrix execution units
- First consumer graphics card to be based on a chiplet design
  - TSMC N5 for Graphics Compute Die (GCD)
  - TSMC N6 for Memory Cache Die (MCD)
- Up to 24 GB of GDDR6 video memory
- Doubled L1 cache from 128 KB to 256 KB per array
- 50% increased L2 cache from 4 MB to 6 MB maximum
- Second-generation Infinity Cache with up to 2.7x peak bandwidth and up to 96 MB (16 MB per MCD) in capacity
- PCI Express 4.0 x8 or x16 interface
- Support for AV1 hardware encoding and decoding for 12-bit video up to 8K60
- New "Radiance Display" Engine with:
  - DisplayPort 2.1 UHBR 13.5 support (up to 54 Gbit/s bandwidth)
  - HDMI 2.1a support (up to 48 Gbit/s bandwidth)
  - Support up to 8K 165 Hz or 4K 480 Hz output with DSC
  - 12-bit color and Rec. 2020 support for HDR

== Navi 3x dies ==
| | Graphics Compute Die (GCD) | | | Memory Cache Die (MCD) |
| | Navi 31 | Navi 32 | Navi 33 | Memory Cache Die (MCD) |
|---|---|---|---|---|
| Codename | Plum Bonito | Wheat Nas | Hotpink Bonefish | —N/a |
| Compute units (Stream processors) [FP32 cores] | 96 (6144) [12288] | 60 (3840) [7680] | 32 (2048) [4096] | —N/a |
| Transistors | 45.7B | 28.1B | 13.3B | 2.05B |
| Transistor density | 152.3 Tr/μm^{2} | 140.5 Tr/μm^{2} | 65.2 Tr/μm^{2} | 55.4 Tr/μm^{2} |
| Die size | 300 mm^{2} | 200 mm^{2} | 204 mm^{2} | 37 mm^{2} |

=== Navi 31 ===
The Navi 31 multi-chip module features 58 billion transistors, a 165% increase in transistor density than the previous generation Navi 2x, across seven dies: one Graphics Compute Die (GCD) and six Memory Cache Dies (MCD). The full Navi 31 die contains 12,288 FP32 cores, equivalent to 6144 stream processors. Reportedly, the Navi 31 die has been designed to scale up to 3.0 GHz frequency, though AMD's Radeon RX 7900 XTX reference design can hit a boost frequency of 2.5 GHz. The Navi 31 die is fabricated on TSMC's N5 process node.

=== Navi 33 ===
The Navi 33 die features 13.3 billion transistors and a die size of 204 mm^{2}. The full die features 4096 FP32 cores, segmented into 32 Compute Units. Unlike the higher-end Navi 31 die, it is a monolithic design fabricated on TSMC's N6 process node.

== Products ==
=== Desktop ===
| Model (Code name) | Release Date & Price | Architecture & fab | Chiplets | Transistors & die size (Note: Approximate die size of all active dies (one GCD and up to six MCD).) | Core | | Fillrate (Note: Boost values (if available) are stated below the base value in italic.) (Note: Texture fillrate is calculated as the number of Texture Mapping Units multiplied by the base (or boost) core clock speed.) (Note: Pixel fillrate is calculated as the number of Render Output Units multiplied by the base (or boost) core clock speed.) | | Processing power (Note: Precision performance is calculated from the base (or boost) core clock speed based on a FMA operation.) (TFLOPS) | | | Infinity Cache | | Memory | | | | TBP | Bus interface |
| Model (Code name) | Release Date & Price | Architecture & fab | Chiplets | Transistors & die size | Config (Note: Unified shaders : Texture mapping units : Render output units : Ray accelerators : AI accelerators and Compute Units (CU)) | Clock (MHz) | Texture (GT/s) | Pixel (GP/s) | Half (Note: Officially declared half-precision performance is twice of the one shown here due to being based on different operation (a×b+c×d+e).) | Single | Double | Size | Bandwidth (GB/s) | Size | Bandwidth (GB/s) | Bus type & width | Clock (MT/s) | TBP | Bus interface |
|---|---|---|---|---|---|---|---|---|---|---|---|---|---|---|---|---|---|---|---|
| Radeon RX 7400 (Navi 33) | Aug 10, 2025; OEM | RDNA 3 TSMC N6 | Monolithic | 13.3×10^{9} 204 mm^{2} | 1792:112:64:28:56; 28 CU | 1100 | | | 15.77 | 7.88 | 0.246 | 32 MB | 362 | 8 GB | 173 | GDDR6; 128-bit | 10800 | 55 W | PCIe 4.0 ×8 |
| Steam Machine GPU (Navi 33) | TBA; OEM | RDNA 3 TSMC N6 | Monolithic | 13.3×10^{9} 204 mm^{2} | 1792:112:64:28:56; 28 CU | 2450 | | | | | | 32 MB | | 8 GB | | GDDR6; 128-bit | | 110 W | PCIe 4.0 ×8 |
| Radeon RX 7600 (Navi 33) | May 25, 2023 $269 USD | RDNA 3 TSMC N6 | Monolithic | 13.3×10^{9} 204 mm^{2} | 2048:128:64:32:64; 32 CU | 1720; 2655 | 220.2; 339.8 | 110.1; 169.9 | 14.09; 21.75 | 14.09; 21.75 | 0.220; 0.340 | 32 MB | 476.9 | 8 GB | 288 | GDDR6; 128-bit | 18000 | 165 W | PCIe 4.0 ×8 |
| Radeon RX 7650 GRE (Navi 33) | Feb 7, 2025; China Only ¥2,049 RMB ($249 USD) | RDNA 3 TSMC N6 | Monolithic | 13.3×10^{9} 204 mm^{2} | 2048:128:64:32:64; 32 CU | 1720; 2695 | 220.2; 345.0 | 110.1; 172.5 | 14.09; 22.08 | 14.09; 22.08 | 0.220; 0.345 | 32 MB | 476.9 | 8 GB | 288 | GDDR6; 128-bit | 18000 | 170 W | PCIe 4.0 ×8 |
| Radeon RX 7600 XT (Navi 33) | Jan 24, 2024 $329 USD | RDNA 3 TSMC N6 | Monolithic | 13.3×10^{9} 204 mm^{2} | 2048:128:64:32:64; 32 CU | 1720; 2755 | 220.2; 352.6 | 110.1; 176.3 | 14.09; 22.57 | 14.09; 22.57 | 0.220; 0.353 | 32 MB | 476.9 | 16 GB | 288 | GDDR6; 128-bit | 18000 | 190 W | PCIe 4.0 ×8 |
| Radeon RX 7700 (Navi 32) | Sep 18, 2025; OEM | RDNA 3 TSMC N5 (GCD); TSMC N6 (MCD) | 1 × GCD; 4 × MCD | 28.1×10^{9} 346 mm^{2} | 2560:160:64:40:80; 40 CU | 1900; 2459 | 304; 393.4 | 121.6; 157.4 | 19.47; 25.20 | 19.47; 25.20 | 0.304; 0.394 | 40 MB | 1927 | 16 GB | 624 | GDDR6; 256-bit | 19500 | 263 W | PCIe 4.0 ×16 |
| Radeon RX 7700 XT (Navi 32) | Sep 6, 2023 $449 USD | RDNA 3 TSMC N5 (GCD); TSMC N6 (MCD) | 1 × GCD; 3 × MCD | 28.1×10^{9} 346 mm^{2} | 3456:216:96:54:108; 54 CU | 1900; 2544 | 410.4; 549.5 | 182.4; 244.2 | 26.27; 35.17 | 26.27; 35.17 | 0.410; 0.550 | 48 MB | 1995 | 12 GB | 432 | GDDR6; 192-bit | 18000 | 245 W | PCIe 4.0 ×16 |
| Radeon RX 7800 XT (Navi 32) | Sep 6, 2023 $499 USD | RDNA 3 TSMC N5 (GCD); TSMC N6 (MCD) | 1 × GCD; 4 × MCD | 28.1×10^{9} 346 mm^{2} | 3840:240:96:60:120; 60 CU | 1800; 2430 | 432; 583.2 | 172.8; 233.2 | 27.64; 37.32 | 27.64; 37.32 | 0.432; 0.583 | 64 MB | 2708 | 16 GB | 624 | GDDR6; 256-bit | 19500 | 263 W | PCIe 4.0 ×16 |
| Radeon RX 7900 GRE (Navi 31) | Jul 27, 2023; China only, Feb 27, 2024 $549 USD | RDNA 3 TSMC N5 (GCD); TSMC N6 (MCD) | 1 × GCD; 4 × MCD | 57.7×10^{9} 529 mm^{2} | 5120:320:160:80:160; 80 CU | 1270; 2245 | 406.4; 718.4 | 243.8; 431.0 | 26.01; 45.98 | 26.01; 45.98 | 0.406; 0.718 | 64 MB | 2250 | 16 GB | 576 | GDDR6; 256-bit | 18000 | 260 W | PCIe 4.0 ×16 |
| Radeon RX 7900 XT (Navi 31) | Dec 13, 2022 $899 USD | RDNA 3 TSMC N5 (GCD); TSMC N6 (MCD) | 1 × GCD; 5 × MCD | 57.7×10^{9} 529 mm^{2} | 5376:336:192:84:168; 84 CU | 1500; 2400 | 504.0; 806.4 | 288.0; 460.8 | 32.26; 51.61 | 32.26; 51.61 | 0.504; 0.806 | 80 MB | 2900 | 20 GB | 800 | GDDR6; 320-bit | 20000 | 315 W | PCIe 4.0 ×16 |
| Radeon RX 7900 XTX (Navi 31) | Dec 13, 2022 $999 USD | RDNA 3 TSMC N5 (GCD); TSMC N6 (MCD) | 1 × GCD; 6 × MCD | 57.7×10^{9} 529 mm^{2} | 6144:384:192:96:192; 96 CU | 1900; 2500 | 729.6; 960.0 | 364.8; 480.0 | 46.69; 61.44 | 46.69; 61.44 | 0.730; 0.960 | 96 MB | 3500 | 24 GB | 960 | GDDR6; 384-bit | 20000 | 355 W | PCIe 4.0 ×16 |

=== Mobile ===
| Model (Code name) | Release date | Architecture & fab | Chiplets | Transistors & die size | Core | | Fillrate (Note: Boost values (if available) are stated below the base value in italic.) (Note: Texture fillrate is calculated as the number of Texture Mapping Units multiplied by the base (or boost) core clock speed.) (Note: Pixel fillrate is calculated as the number of Render Output Units multiplied by the base (or boost) core clock speed.) | | Processing power (Note: Precision performance is calculated from the base (or boost) core clock speed based on a FMA operation.) (TFLOPS) (Note: GPUs based on RDNA 3 have dual-issue stream processors so that up to two shader instructions can be executed per clock cycle under certain parallelism conditions.) | | | Infinity Cache | Memory | | | | TDP | Interface |
| Model (Code name) | Release date | Architecture & fab | Chiplets | Transistors & die size | Config (Note: Unified shaders : Texture mapping units : Render output units : Ray accelerators : AI accelerators and Compute units (CU)) | Clock (MHz) | Texture (GT/s) | Pixel (GP/s) | Half (Note: Officially declared half-precision performance is twice of the one shown here due to being based on different operation (a×b+c×d+e).) | Single | Double | Infinity Cache | Size | Bandwidth (GB/s) | Bus type & width | Clock (MT/s) | TDP | Interface |
|---|---|---|---|---|---|---|---|---|---|---|---|---|---|---|---|---|---|---|
| Radeon RX 7600S (Navi 33) | Jan 4, 2023 | RDNA 3 TSMC N6 | Monolithic | 13.3×10^{9} 204 mm^{2} | 1792:112:64:28:56; 28 CU | 1500; 2200 | 168.0; 246.4 | 96.00; 140.8 | 10.75; 15.77 | 10.75; 15.77 | 0.168; 0.246 | 32 MB | 8 GB | 256 | GDDR6; 128-bit | 16000 | 75 W | PCIe 4.0 ×8 |
| Radeon RX 7600M (Navi 33) | Jan 4, 2023 | RDNA 3 TSMC N6 | Monolithic | 13.3×10^{9} 204 mm^{2} | 1792:112:64:28:56; 28 CU | 1500; 2410 | 168.0; 269.9 | 96.0; 154.2 | 10.75; 17.28 | 10.75; 17.28 | 0.168; 0.270 | 32 MB | 8 GB | 256 | GDDR6; 128-bit | 16000 | 90 W | PCIe 4.0 ×8 |
| Radeon RX 7600M XT (Navi 33) | Jan 4, 2023 | RDNA 3 TSMC N6 | Monolithic | 13.3×10^{9} 204 mm^{2} | 2048:128:64:32:64; 32 CU | 1500; 2615 | 192.0; 334.1 | 96.00; 167.0 | 12.29; 21.42 | 12.29; 21.42 | 0.192; 0.335 | 32 MB | 8 GB | 288 | GDDR6; 128-bit | 18000 | 120 W | PCIe 4.0 ×8 |
| Radeon RX 7700S (Navi 33) | Jan 4, 2023 | RDNA 3 TSMC N6 | Monolithic | 13.3×10^{9} 204 mm^{2} | 2048:128:64:32:64; 32 CU | 1500; 2500 | 192.0; 320.0 | 96.0; 160.0 | 12.29; 20.48 | 12.29; 20.48 | 0.192; 0.320 | 32 MB | 8 GB | 288 | GDDR6; 128-bit | 18000 | 100 W | PCIe 4.0 ×8 |
| Radeon RX 7800M (Navi 32) | Sep 11, 2024 | RDNA 3 TSMC N5 (GCD); TSMC N6 (MCD) | 1 × GCD; 3 × MCD | 28.1×10^{9} 346 mm^{2} | 3840:240:96:60:120; 60 CU | 2335 | 560.4 | 224.2 | 35.87 | 35.87 | 0.560 | 48 MB | 12 GB | 432 | GDDR6; 192-bit | 18000 | 180 W | ? |
| Radeon RX 7900M (Navi 31) | Oct 19, 2023 | RDNA 3 TSMC N5 (GCD); TSMC N6 (MCD) | 1 × GCD; 4 × MCD | 57.7×10^{9} 529 mm^{2} | 4608:288:192:72:144; 72 CU | 1825; 2090 | 525.6; 601.9 | 350.4; 401.3 | 33.64; 38.52 | 33.64; 38.52 | 0.526; 0.602 | 64 MB | 16 GB | 576 | GDDR6; 256-bit | 18000 | 180 W | PCIe 4.0 ×16 |

== Issues ==
=== Idle power usage ===
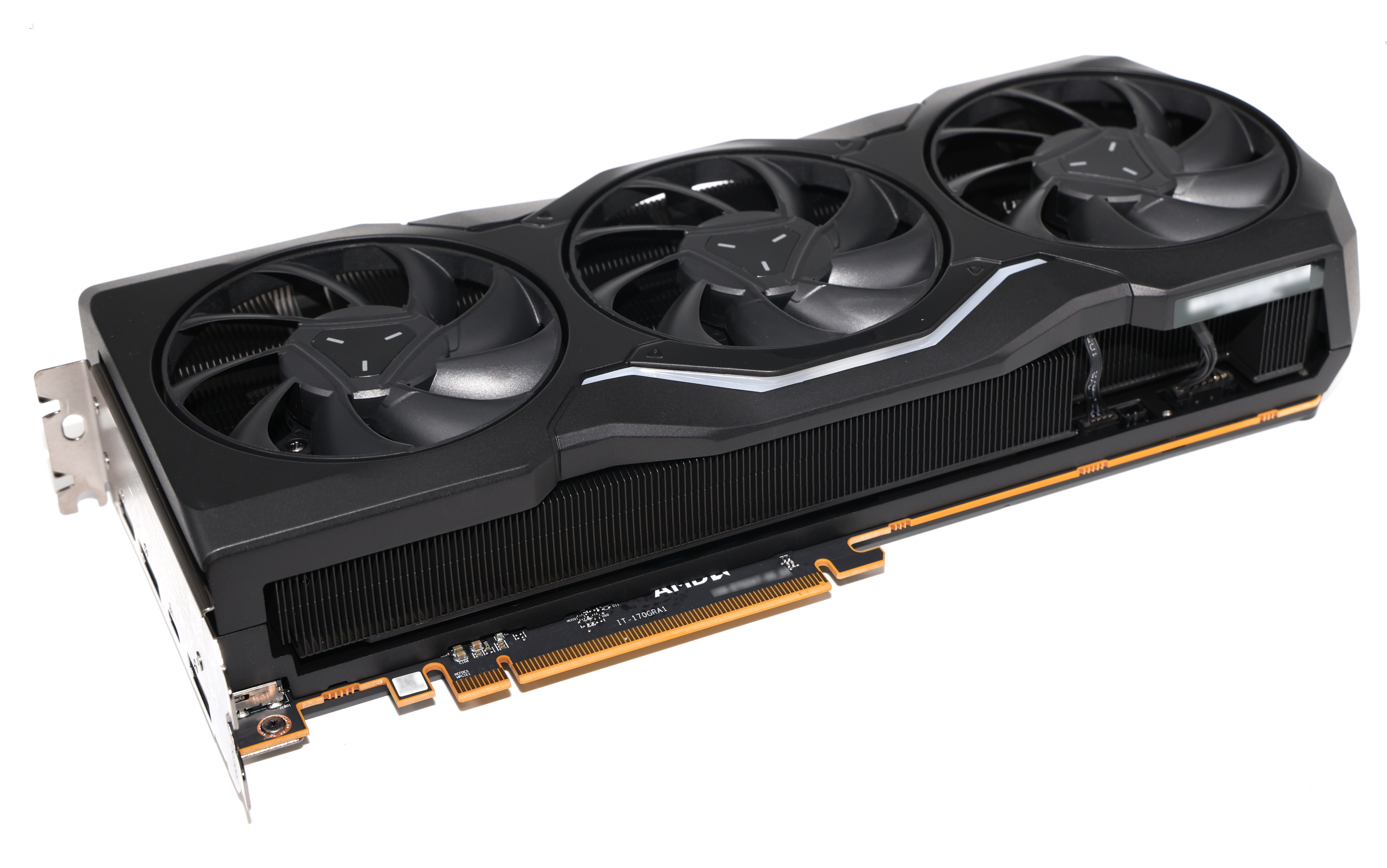
A SAPPHIRE Radeon RX 7900 XTX.

Abnormally high power draw while at idle was observed with the Radeon RX 7900 XT and RX 7900 XTX when using select high resolution, high refresh rate displays and when the GPU is decoding video. ComputerBase discovered that the RX 7900 XT and RX 7900 XTX drew a respective 71W and 80W when decoding and playing a 4K 60FPS YouTube video compared to the 30W used by the RX 6900 XT for the same task. AMD acknowledged the issue and it was added to the list of known issues to be addressed with future updates to drivers and Radeon Adrenalin software. On December 22, 2022, Adrenalin Edition 22.12.2 was released and its RDNA 3-exclusive driver significantly reduced the GPU's power usage at idle and when decoding video.

=== Reference card temperature issues ===
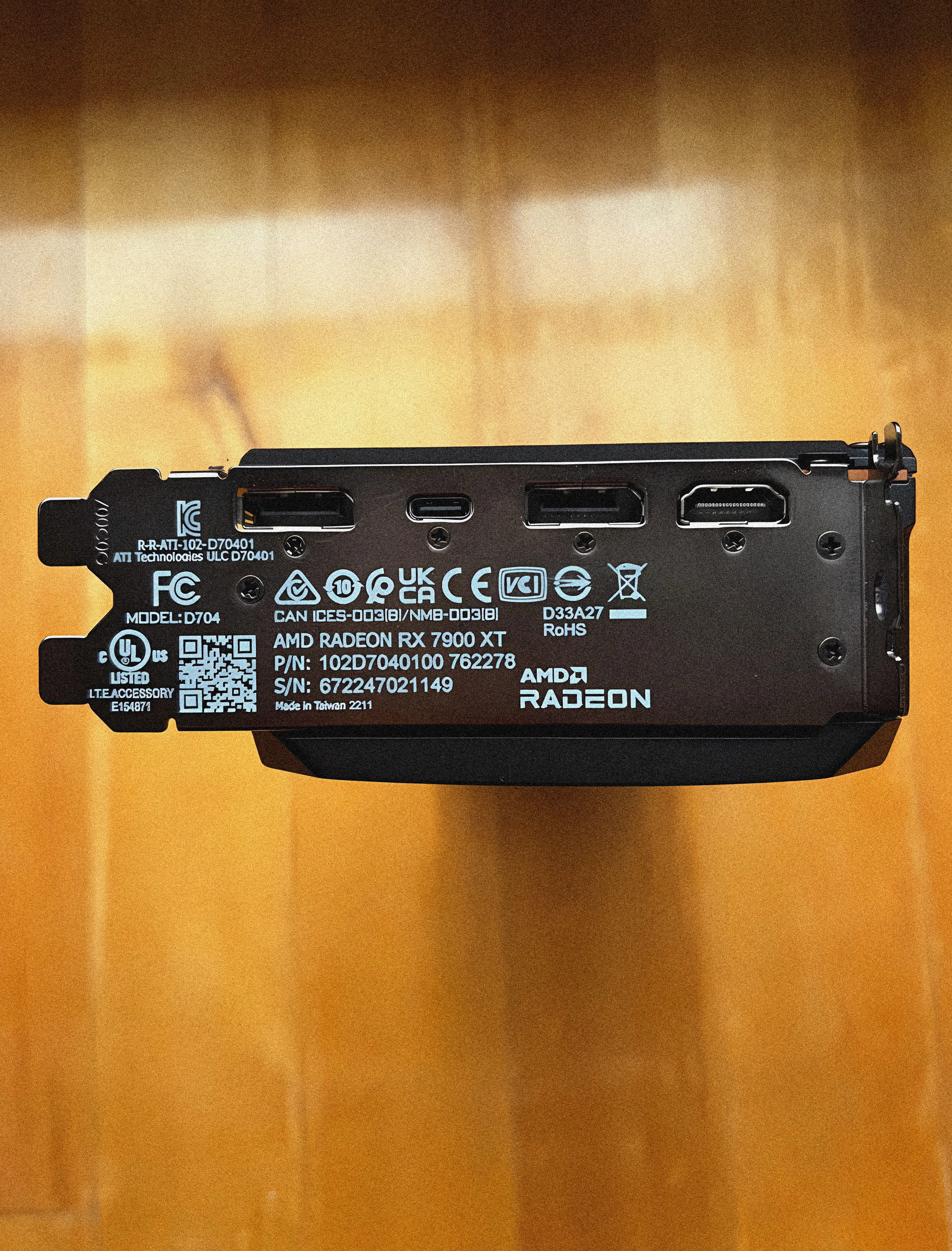
I/O arrangement of an RX 7900 XT.

AMD's reference editions of the Radeon RX 7900 XT and RX 7900 XTX have suffered from high temperatures of up to 109 °C on the GPU hot spot. AIB partner cards were confirmed to not be affected by this issue. The loud fans and thermal throttling on reference cards could have been as a result of poor contact between the reference cooler and the GPU chiplets. HardwareLuxx instead considered that the direct die cooling used for the Navi 31 chiplets could be difficult due to uneven contact pressure across the seven dies even if they may look to be level. AMD issued a statement in December 2022 that it was investigating the issue. AMD said that the noisy fans and thermal throttling on reference cards were due to a manufacturing defect where there was an insufficient amount of water in vapor chambers. Affected cards would be replaced by AMD upon request.

On January 6, 2023, Scott Herkelman, Senior Vice President & General Manager Graphics at AMD, said in an interview with PCWorld that "you would see a small performance delta" if the GPU throttles at 110 °C during certain workloads. Some media outlets disagreed with statements made by Herkelman, such as how he said there was "a small performance delta" when 3 out of 4 affected RX 7900 XTX performed worse than a previous generation 6900 XT in the same test. Usually, the RX 7900 XTX performs approximately 30–60% better than a 6900 XT.

== See also ==
- Radeon RX 5000 series – based on first implementation of RDNA architecture
- Radeon RX 6000 series – AMD's predecessor to Radeon RX 7000 series (RDNA 2 based)
- Radeon RX 9000 series – AMD's successor to Radeon RX 7000 series (RDNA 4 based)
- Radeon Pro – AMD's workstation graphics solution
- AMD Instinct – AMD's professional HPC/GPGPU solution
- RDNA (microarchitecture)
- RDNA 3 – microarchitecture used by the RX 7000 series
- List of AMD graphics processing units
- GeForce RTX 40 series – competing Nvidia GPU generation released in a similar time-frame
