= Steam machine (disambiguation) =

The Steam Machine is a custom gaming computer made by Valve Corporation.

Steam machine may also refer to:

== Computing ==
- Steam Machines, a family of pre-built gaming computers designed to run SteamOS
  - § Alienware Steam Machine, a custom gaming PC by Alienware
  - § Valve Steam Machine (prototype) (2013), a prototype gaming PC by Valve Corporation
- Heron: Steam Machine, a puzzle video game by Triangle Studios

== Other ==
- Steam engine, a type of engine powered by steam, sometimes called a steam machine
- "Steam Machine", a 2005 song by Daft Punk from the album Human After All
- "Steam Machine", a 1983 song by Freur from the album Doot-Doot

== See also ==
- Steamer § Transportation, vehicles using steam for propulsion
- Steam cleaning, the cleaning process using steam
- Clothes steamer
- Food steamer
- Steam cannon, a cannon that launches a projectile using only heat and water
- Live steam, steam-powered models and toys
- Index of steam energy articles
