= Steampunk (disambiguation) =

Steampunk is a subgenre of speculative fiction or science fiction that emphasizes anachronistic technology, usually from the Victorian era. It is also used to refer to a trend in fashion and music.

Steampunk may also refer to:

== In literature ==
- Steampunk (anthology), a 2008 anthology of steampunk fiction edited by Ann VanderMeer and Jeff VanderMeer
- Steampunk (comics), a comic book series by artist Chris Bachalo and writer Joe Kelly, published by Wildstorm Comics' Cliffhanger imprint
- Steampunk Magazine, an online and print semi-annual magazine devoted to the steampunk subculture

There is also a List of steampunk works.

== In television ==
- Steam Punks!, a gameshow on Australian children's TV

== See also ==
- Cyberpunk derivatives
- Neo-Victorian
- Retrofuturism
