= National Traction Engine Trust =

The National Traction Engine Trust is an association representing steam roller and traction engine owners in the United Kingdom. A junior wing called the Steam Apprentice Club exists to train skills to future generations. The trust was founded in 1954 as the National Traction Engine Club and remains the main umbrella organization for operating preserved steam vehicles on the road network. A motto of "Preserving our heritage with steam on the road" is used.

The trust coordinates an "Approved Rally List" each year, of planned steam rally events, setting a code of practice for safety and ensuring that events do not overlap. The previous largest yearly event was the Great Dorset Steam Fair (1969‒2024), attracting around 500 road vehicles.

On the sixtieth anniversary of the organisation, a cavalcade of 180 steam vehicles toured Bedfordshire.

A magazine called Steaming is produced by the organisation.

As of 2004 John Astor, 3rd Baron Astor of Hever was patron. As of 2015 the vice-chair was Hugh Dyson. As of 2016 the head of technical services was David Smith. As of 2017 Sir William McAlpine, 6th Baronet was patron. At the beginning of 2018 Anthony Coulls was the chair of the trust, before Rob Wing became chair.
