= Radeon X Series =

Radeon X Series can refer to:

- ATi Radeon R300 Series (Radeon X300, X600 series)
- ATi Radeon R400 Series (Radeon X700, X800 series)
- Radeon X1000 series (Radeon X1000 series)
