= Radeon RX 9000 series =

AMD graphics processing units

AMD Radeon RX 9000 series
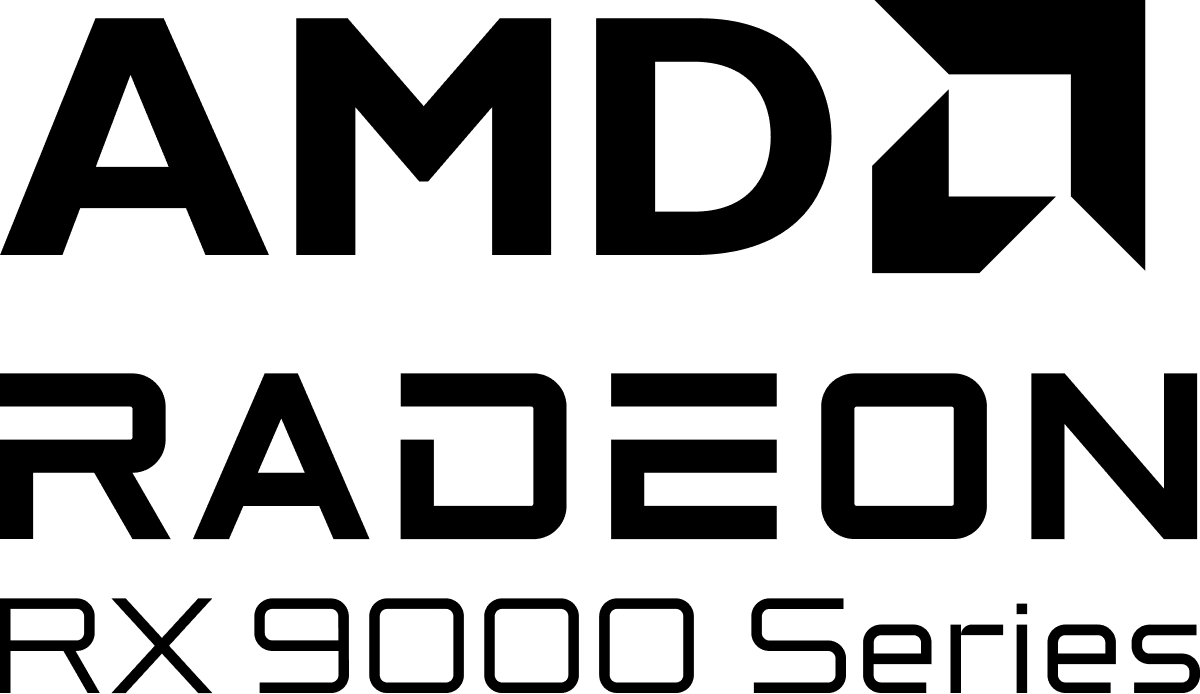
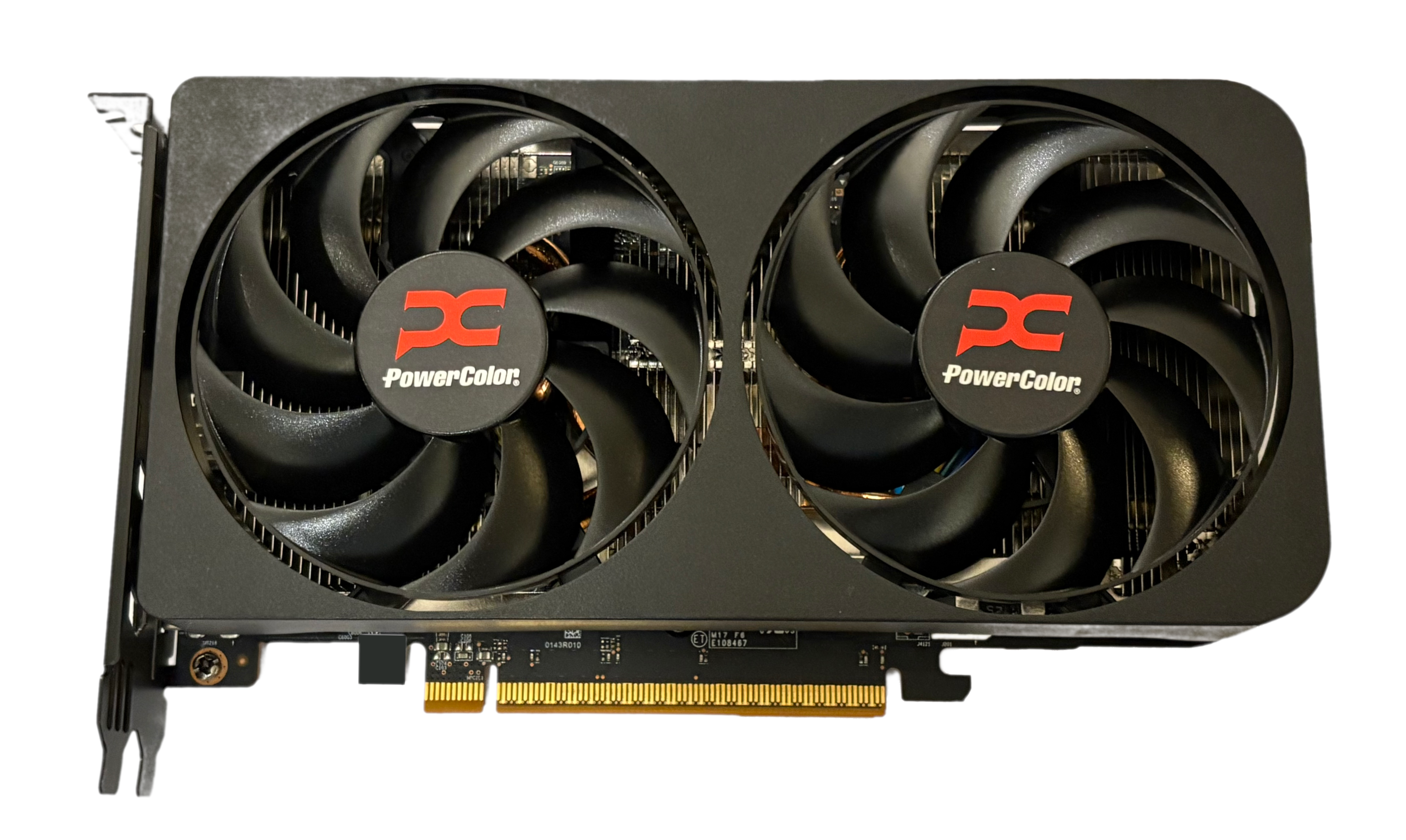
- An AMD Radeon RX 9060 XT
- Release date: March 6, 2025 (19 months ago)
- Manufactured by: TSMC
- Designed by: AMD
- Marketed by: AMD
- Codename: Navi 4x
- Architecture: RDNA 4
- Transistors: 29.7B (Navi 44); 53.9B (Navi 48)
- Fabrication process: TSMC N4P

Cards
- Entry-level: Radeon RX 9050; Radeon RX 9060; Radeon RX 9060 XT (8 GB)
- Mid-range: Radeon RX 9060 XT (16 GB); Radeon RX 9070 GRE
- High-end: Radeon RX 9070; Radeon RX 9070 XT

API support
- OpenCL: OpenCL 2.2
- OpenGL: OpenGL 4.6
- Vulkan: Vulkan 1.4
- DirectX: Direct3D 12.0 Ultimate (feature level 12_2); Shader Model 6.8

History
- Predecessor: Radeon RX 7000 series

Support status
- Supported

The Radeon RX 9000 series is a series of consumer graphics processing units developed by AMD, based on the RDNA 4 architecture. The series is targeting the mainstream segment and is the successor to the Radeon RX 7000 series.

== Background ==
AMD's Q3 2024 earnings call in October 2024 confirmed that RDNA 4 would be releasing in early 2025 with CEO Lisa Su saying that the architecture "delivers significantly higher ray tracing performance and adds new AI capabilities".

In December 2024, an AMD advertising campaign tie-in with Call of Duty: Black Ops 6 on Reddit showed a Ryzen 9 processor and what appeared to be the Radeon RX 9070 XT reference design.

The Radeon RX 9000 series and RDNA 4 architecture were officially previewed on January 6, 2025 during AMD's CES keynote in Las Vegas. AMD were light on concrete details surrounding the RDNA 4 architecture or the Radeon RX 9000 series during their CES keynote. The Radeon RX 9000 series targets midrange performance and value rather than competing with Nvidia at the high-end like the Radeon RX 7000 series did. This is a similar approach taken by the RX 5000 series in 2019. On January 8, 2025, reports surfaced that U.S. retailer B&H would begin pre-orders for the Radeon RX 9000 series on January 23.

The Radeon RX 9070 series was revealed on February 28, 2025 in an AMD live stream event.

The Radeon RX 9060 XT was revealed on May 21, 2025 during AMD's Computex keynote.

== Features ==
=== RDNA 4 architecture ===
The RDNA 4 architecture used by the Radeon RX 9000 series is, according to AMD, focused on improved ray tracing performance and expanded AI acceleration capabilities with an "optimized" Compute Unit design.

- RDNA 4 architecture built on TSMC 4 nm process (TSMC 4N Gen 5 Display Engine)
- AMD RDNA 4 Compute Units with redesigned 3rd generation Raytracing Accelerators for improved ray tracing performance and image quality
- 2nd Generation AI Accelerators with support for FP16, INT8 operations, and sparsity acceleration enabling up to 4× FP16 and 8× INT8 throughput for AI workloads
- AMD HYPR-RX1 technology combining Radeon Super Resolution, FidelityFX Super Resolution 4, Radeon Anti-Lag 24, Radeon Boost, and AMD Fluid Motion Frames 2.1 for advanced AI-based upscaling and frame generation
- PCIe 5.0 support for high bandwidth GPU-to-CPU communication
- Display connectivity includes DisplayPort 2.1a and HDMI 2.1b with support for high refresh rates and resolutions
- AMD Infinity Cache 3rd generation with up to 64 MB cache to reduce memory latency and increase bandwidth efficiency
- Memory subsystem supports up to 16 GB GDDR6 with up to 640 GB/s memory bandwidth depending on model and interface width
- Advanced media engine optimized for ultra-fast video encoding/decoding and enhanced streaming capabilities
- No dedicated multi-GPU or NVLink equivalent support (focus on single GPU scalability)
- Double-precision (FP64) performance of RDNA 4 architecture is significantly lower than single-precision (FP32), optimized primarily for gaming and AI workloads rather than HPC use cases

=== FSR 4 ===
FidelityFX Super Resolution 4 (FSR 4) is AMD's first machine-learning upscaling solution that is able to leverage the second-generation AI accelerator cores in the RDNA 4 architecture. AMD stated that due to requiring hardware acceleration, FSR 4 was limited to the Radeon RX 9000 series. Call of Duty: Black Ops 6 was first title to integrate FSR 4 upscaling support. On June 22, 2026 FSR 4 was released for the Radeon RX 7000 series.

As of August 2025, over 75 games include support for FSR 4.

== Products ==
=== Desktop ===
Radeon RX		9050	9060	9060 XT	9070 GRE	9070	9070 XT
Release date		28 Jul 2026 (APAC/JP/LATAM)	5 Aug 2025	5 Jun 2025	8 May 2025 (China); 1 Jun 2026 (Worldwide)	6 Mar 2025	
Launch MSRP		$279 USD	OEM	$299 USD (8 GB) $349 USD (16 GB)	¥4,199 CNY (Note: Original China-only MSRP.) $549 USD	$549 USD	$599 USD
GPU die		Navi 44			Navi 48		
Transistors (billion)		29.7			53.9		
Die size		199 mm^{2}			356.5 mm^{2}		
Core	Stream processors	1024	1792	2048	3072	3584	4096
Core	Texture mapping units	64	112	128	192	224	256
Core	Render output units	64			96	128	
Core	Ray accelerators	16	28	32	48	56	64
Core	AI accelerators	32	56	64	96	112	128
Core	Game frequency (GHz) Boost frequency (GHz)	1.92; 2.60	2.40; 2.99	2.53; 3.13	2.22; 2.79	2.07; 2.52	2.40; 2.97
Compute units		16	28	32	48	56	64
Cache	L0	32 KB per CU					
Cache	L1	128 KB per Array					
Cache	L2	4 MB			8 MB		
Cache	L3	16/32 MB	32 MB		48 MB	64 MB	
Memory	Type	GDDR6					
Memory	Size	4/8 GB	8 GB	8 GB; 16 GB	12 GB	16 GB	
Memory	Clock (Gb/s)	18		20.1	18	20.1	
Memory	Bandwidth (GB/s)	144/288	288	320	432	640	
Memory	Bus width	64/128-bit	128-bit		192-bit	256-bit	
Fillrate	Pixel (Gpx/s) (Note: Pixel fillrate is calculated as the number of render output units (ROPs) multiplied by the base (or boost) core clock speed.)	166.4	191.4	200.3	267.8	322.6	380.2
Fillrate	Texture (Gtex/s) (Note: Texture fillrate is calculated as the number of texture mapping units (TMUs) multiplied by the base (or boost) core clock speed.)	166.4	334.9	400.6	535.7	564.5	760.3
Processing power	FP16 (TFLOPS) (Note: Formerly officially declared performance is twice the one shown here due to the use of a different operation (a×b+c×d+e).)	10.6	21.4	25.6	34.3	36.1	48.7
Processing power	FP32 (TFLOPS)	10.6	21.4	25.6	34.3	36.1	48.7
Processing power	AI FP16 (TFLOPS) (Note: Officially declared performance is 2x shown here due to sparsity.)	43	85	103	137	145	195
Processing power	AI INT8 or FP8 (TOPS)	85	171	205	274	289	389
Processing power	AI INT4 (TOPS)	170	343	410	549	578	778
Interface	Host	PCIe 5.0 x16					
Interface	Power	1x 8-pin			2x 8-pin		
Interface	Displays	1x HDMI 2.1b, 2x DisplayPort 2.1a			1x HDMI 2.1b, 3x DisplayPort 2.1a		
TDP		92 W	132 W	150 W (8 GB); 160 W (16 GB)	220 W		304 W

== See also ==
- Radeon RX 5000 series – first implementation of RDNA architecture
- Radeon RX 6000 series
- Radeon RX 7000 series – AMD's predecessor to Radeon RX 9000 series (RDNA 3 based)
- RDNA (microarchitecture)
- RDNA 4 – microarchitecture used by the RX 9000 series
- List of AMD graphics processing units
- GeForce RTX 50 series – competing Nvidia GPU generation released in a similar time-frame
- Arc B-Series – competing Intel GPU generation released in a similar time-frame
