= Steamer =

Steamer may refer to:

== Transportation ==
- Steamboat, smaller, insular boat on lakes and rivers
- Steamship, ocean-faring ship
- Screw steamer, steamboat or ship that uses "screws" (propellers)
- Steam yacht, luxury or commercial yacht
- Paddle steamer, steamboat or ship with a paddlewheel
- Steam car, generic term for a car powered by a steam engine
- Stanley Steamer, model of steam-powered car
- Steam locomotive, locomotive propelled by steam-operated pistons

== Sports ==
- Steamer Flanagan (1881–1947), Major League Baseball player
- Steamer Horning (1892–1982), American football player
- Steamer Maxwell (1890–1975), Canadian amateur ice-hockey player
- Stan Smyl (born 1958), captain of the Vancouver Canucks, nicknamed "the Steamer"

== Other uses ==
- Steamer (milk), a flavored milk drink
- Steamer (wetsuit), covers the torso and arms and legs
- Steamer trunk, a type of luggage
- The Steamer, an album by jazz saxophonist Stan Getz
- Clothes steamer
- Food steamer
- Fastball, nickname for the baseball pitch
- Soft-shell clam, nickname for soft-shell clams
- Tachyeres, steamer ducks

== See also ==
- Steam (disambiguation)
