= 2025 in video games =

In the video game industry, 2025 saw large-scale layoffs occurring since 2022, contracting from the large growth that had happened during the COVID-19 pandemic. Among other hardware, Nintendo released the Nintendo Switch 2 console, though along with Sony Interactive Entertainment and Microsoft, had to adjust the pricing on their hardware within the United States and Canada as a result of tariffs placed by U.S. President Donald Trump. Additional costs to hardware came about from the growth of the AI bubble, with memory chips being directed to commercial data center growth over consumer sales.

2025 also saw smaller companies and individual developers achieve outsize success compared to larger AAA studios with games developed by smaller teams such as Clair Obscur: Expedition 33 and Kingdom Come: Deliverance II achieving critical acclaim and commercial success while Schedule I's early access release generated $60–125 million in gross revenue within just months of release, and Hollow Knight: Silksong sold over 7 million copies.

Major developers faced financial difficulties and continued layoffs, leading to Ubisoft striking a deal with Tencent and Electronic Arts being bought out by a group of private equity firms led by the Saudi Public Investment Fund. Call of Duty: Black Ops 7's negative reception saw Activision announce a change to its release schedule for upcoming Call of Duty games.

== Top-rated games ==
=== Critically acclaimed games ===
The following table lists the top-rated games released in 2025 based on Metacritic, which generally considers expansions as separate entities. The original versions of these games were released in 2025.

2025 releases scoring 90/100 or higher on Metacritic
Title	Developer(s)	Publisher(s)	Release	Platform(s)	Average score
Hades II	Supergiant Games		September 25, 2025	WIN, NS, NS2	95
Clair Obscur: Expedition 33	Sandfall Interactive	Kepler Interactive	April 24, 2025	WIN, PS5, XSX/S	92
Blue Prince	Dogubomb	Raw Fury	April 10, 2025	WIN, PS5, XSX/S	92
Split Fiction	Hazelight Studios	Electronic Arts	March 6, 2025	WIN, PS5, XSX/S, NS2	91
Donkey Kong Bananza	Nintendo EPD	Nintendo	July 17, 2025	NS2	91
Hollow Knight: Silksong	Team Cherry		September 4, 2025	WIN, PS4, PS5, XBO, XSX/S, NS, NS2	90

=== Major awards ===
Clair Obscur: Expedition 33 became the second game (after 2023's Baldur's Gate 3) to sweep the Game of the Year categories at the five major awards ceremonies: the British Academy Games Awards, D.I.C.E. Awards, Game Awards, Game Developers Choice Awards, and Golden Joystick Awards.

Category		43rd Golden Joystick Awards November 20, 2025	The Game Awards 2025 December 11, 2025	29th Annual D.I.C.E. Awards February 12, 2026	26th Game Developers Choice Awards March 12, 2026	22nd British Academy Games Awards April 17, 2026
Game of the Year		Clair Obscur: Expedition 33				
Independent / Debut (Note: Some award presentations combine these categories.)	Indie	Blue Prince, Hollow Knight: Silksong (Note: Self-published Indie)	Clair Obscur: Expedition 33	Blue Prince	Clair Obscur: Expedition 33	
Independent / Debut	Debut	Blue Prince, Hollow Knight: Silksong	Clair Obscur: Expedition 33	Blue Prince	Clair Obscur: Expedition 33	
Mobile		—N/a	Umamusume: Pretty Derby	Persona 5: The Phantom X	—N/a	
VR / AR		—N/a	The Midnight Walk	Ghost Town	—N/a	
Artistic Achievement	Animation	Clair Obscur: Expedition 33		South of Midnight	Clair Obscur: Expedition 33	Dispatch
Artistic Achievement	Art Direction	Clair Obscur: Expedition 33		Clair Obscur: Expedition 33	Clair Obscur: Expedition 33	Death Stranding 2: On the Beach
Audio	Music	Clair Obscur: Expedition 33		Ghost of Yōtei	Clair Obscur: Expedition 33	Ghost of Yōtei
Audio	Sound Design	Ghost of Yōtei	Battlefield 6	Death Stranding 2: On the Beach	Clair Obscur: Expedition 33	Dispatch
Character or Performance	Leading Role	Jennifer English as Maelle; Clair Obscur: Expedition 33	Jennifer English as Maelle; Clair Obscur: Expedition 33	Atsu; Ghost of Yōtei	—N/a	Jennifer English as Maelle; Clair Obscur: Expedition 33
Character or Performance	Supporting Role	Ben Starr as Verso; Clair Obscur: Expedition 33	Jennifer English as Maelle; Clair Obscur: Expedition 33	Atsu; Ghost of Yōtei	—N/a	Jeffrey Wright as Chase; Dispatch
Game Design or Direction	Game Design	—N/a	Clair Obscur: Expedition 33	Blue Prince	Blue Prince	
Game Design or Direction	Game Direction	—N/a	Clair Obscur: Expedition 33	Clair Obscur: Expedition 33	Blue Prince	
Narrative		Clair Obscur: Expedition 33				Kingdom Come: Deliverance II
Technical Achievement		—N/a		Death Stranding 2: On the Beach		Ghost of Yōtei
Multiplayer / Online		Peak	ARC Raiders		—N/a	ARC Raiders
Action		—N/a	Hades II		—N/a	
Adventure		—N/a	Hollow Knight: Silksong	Ghost of Yōtei	—N/a	
Family		—N/a	Donkey Kong Bananza	Lego Party	—N/a	Lego Party
Fighting		—N/a	Fatal Fury: City of the Wolves	Mortal Kombat: Legacy Kollection	—N/a	
Role-Playing		—N/a	Clair Obscur: Expedition 33		—N/a	
Sports / Racing	Sports	—N/a	Mario Kart World	Rematch	—N/a	
Sports / Racing	Racing	—N/a	Mario Kart World	Mario Kart World	—N/a	
Strategy / Simulation		—N/a	Final Fantasy Tactics - The Ivalice Chronicles	The Alters	—N/a	
Social Impact		—N/a	South of Midnight	—N/a	Consume Me	Despelote
Special Award		—N/a	Game Changer	Hall of Fame	Lifetime Achievement	BAFTA Fellowship
Special Award		—N/a	Girls Make Games	Evan Wells	Don Daglow	Ilkka Paananen

== Major events ==
Month	Day(s)	Event
January	7–10	New gaming accessories and handheld consoles were revealed during the Consumer Electronics Show (CES) 2025 showcase held at the Las Vegas Convention Center in Winchester, Nevada.
February	11–13	The Academy of Interactive Arts & Sciences hosted the 2025 D.I.C.E. Summit and the 28th Annual D.I.C.E. Awards at the Aria Resort and Casino in Las Vegas, Nevada.
February	25	Warner Bros. Games closed Monolith Productions, Player First Games, and WB Games San Diego.
March	12	Scopely acquired the games division and related intellectual property of Niantic, Inc. for $3.5 billion, which included Niantic's Pokémon Go and Monster Hunter Now.
March	17–21	The 2025 Game Developers Conference, including the Game Developers Choice Awards and the Independent Game Festival, were held in San Francisco, California.
March	19	The first industry-wide video game union, the United Videogame Workers-Communication Workers of America, covering both the United States and Canada, was announced.
March	25	Game Informer announced that it had been acquired by Gunzilla Games and re-established themselves as an independent video game news outlet, additionally mentioning a revival of their print magazine and return of all laid off staff members.
March	27	Ubisoft announced the formation of Vantage Studios, a four billion euro subsidiary, with a 25% ownership by Tencent, to manage its top franchises, including Assassin's Creed and Far Cry.
April	2–13	The 2025 London Games Festival, which comprises New Game Plus, the BAFTA Games Awards, Games Finance Market, Screen Play, Now Play This, The Trafalgar Square Games Festival, Side Events and The London Video Game Orchestra were held in London, England.
April	29	Electronic Arts laid off between 300 and 400 employees, including at Respawn Entertainment and Codemasters.
May	2	Rockstar Games issued a statement announcing a delay for Grand Theft Auto VI, pushing its release date to May 26, 2026.
May	9–11	Evo Japan 2025 was held at Tokyo Big Sight in Tokyo.
May	22	Super Nintendo World opened to the public alongside Universal Epic Universe in Florida.
May	22	The Pac-Man franchise celebrated its 45th anniversary in Japan.
June	6–9	Several streamed presentations were shown as part of Summer Game Fest 2025, including a live show on June 6 at the YouTube Theater in Inglewood, California.
July	2	Microsoft laid off about 4% of its workforce, leading to the closure of The Initiative, layoffs at several Microsoft Gaming studios, and the cancellation of several games.
July	9	SAG-AFTRA members voted to ratify a new interactive media contract negotiated with game developers and publishers, ending the year-long strike impacting voice actors.
July	29	Atari SA announced plans to acquire a controlling interest of Thunderful Group for about 4.5 million euro.
August	1–3	The 2025 Evolution Championship Series was held at the Las Vegas Convention Center in Winchester, Nevada.
August	20–24	Gamescom 2025 was held in Cologne, Germany.
September	13	The Super Mario franchise celebrated its 40th anniversary in Japan.
September	25–28	Tokyo Game Show 2025 was held in the Makuhari Messe, in Chiba, Japan.
September	29	Electronic Arts announced its intent to be acquired as a private company by the Saudi Arabian Public Investment Fund, Silver Lake and Affinity Partners for $55 billion, to close by June 2026 pending approvals.
November	6	Rockstar Games issued a statement announcing a delay for Grand Theft Auto VI, pushing its release date to November 19, 2026.
December	5	Netflix announced its intent to acquire Warner Bros. Discovery, including Warner Bros. Games, in a deal valued at $82.6 billion.
December	11	The Game Awards 2025 was held at the Peacock Theater in Los Angeles.
December	31	Doug Bowser retired as president and COO of Nintendo of America, with executive vice president of revenue, marketing and consumer experience Devon Pritchard succeeding as president and former president of Nintendo of Europe Satoru Shibata joining as CEO.

== Notable deaths ==
- January 9 – Alan Emrich, 65, video game writer who coined the term 4X.
- January 12 – Robert Machray, 79, actor with voice roles in The Dark Eye and Star Wars Rogue Squadron II: Rogue Leader.
- January 15 – David Lynch, 78, surrealist filmmaker whose work influenced numerous video games, including the Alan Wake series, The Legend of Zelda: Link's Awakening, Silent Hill 2, the Persona series, Disco Elysium, and Deadly Premonition.
- January 24 – Tetsuhisa Seko, 54, president of Nippon Ichi Software.
- January 30 – Wayne June, voice actor who was announcer for Dota 2 and narrator of Darkest Dungeon.
- February 3 – Stéphane Picq, 59, composer who scored Dune, MegaRace, Lost Eden, Atlantis: The Lost Tales, and Riverworld.
- February 10 – Peter Tuiasosopo, 61, actor who played E. Honda in 1994's Street Fighter.
- February 14 – William Roberts, 80, voice actor who voiced Vesemir in The Witcher series and Dromarch in Xenoblade Chronicles 2.
- February 16 – Viktor Antonov, 52, art director of Half-Life 2 and Dishonored.
- February 21 – Peter Jason, 80, actor with voice roles in Fallout 2 and Gears of War.
- March 11 – Dave Mallow, 76, voice actor who voiced Akuma in the Street Fighter and Marvel vs. Capcom series.
- March 12
  - Thomas Lee, 59, former EA employee who worked on games such as Final Fantasy IX, Parasite Eve, and Wing Commander III.
  - Takashi Inagaki, 87, voice actor who voiced Yen Sid in the Kingdom Hearts series, Epic Mickey, and Epic Mickey 2: The Power of Two.
- March 25 – Abdulaziz "HAX$" Al-Yami, 30, pro Super Smash Bros. Melee player.
- April 3 – Narayana "River Boy" Johnson, audio director and composer for Cult of the Lamb.
- April 5 – Bill Petras, art director for Blizzard Entertainment on several games, including StarCraft, World of Warcraft and Overwatch.
- May 30 – Renée Victor, 86, actress who voiced female Argonians in The Elder Scrolls V: Skyrim.
- June 2 – Tim LeTourneau, developer with Maxis including producer on The Sims.
- June 9 – Pik-Sen Lim, 80, Chinese-born actress, including the voice of the narrator in the Dark Souls series.
- July 3 – Michael Madsen, 67, film actor with various voice roles in video games including Grand Theft Auto III, Driver 3, Narc and Dishonored.
- July 8 – James Carter Cathcart, 71, voice actor who portrayed Gary Oak, James, Meowth and Professor Oak in Pokémon, and other appearances in Kirby: Right Back at Ya!, Sonic X, and Shadow the Hedgehog.
- July 22 – Julian LeFay, 59, programmer from Bethesda Softworks considered the "father of the Elder Scrolls" for his work on The Elder Scrolls: Arena and The Elder Scrolls II: Daggerfall.
- July 24 – Hulk Hogan, 71, pro wrestler who appeared in several WWE, WCW, and TNA video games including serving as the cover athlete of MicroLeague Wrestling, WWF WrestleMania, among other titles.
- August 17 – Terence Stamp, 87, actor who appeared in The Getaway: Black Monday, The Elder Scrolls IV: Oblivion, Halo 3 and Wanted: Weapons of Fate.
- September 26 – Andrew Dice, co-founder of Carpe Fulgur.
- October 2 – Kazuki Motoyama, 69, artist and writer of the Mario manga published by Kodansha in Comic BomBom.
- October 16 – Tomonobu Itagaki, 58, game designer, creator of Dead or Alive series and Ninja Gaiden series.
- November 17 – Rebecca Heineman, 62, co-founder of Interplay Entertainment and video game developer for several titles.
- November 21 – Lamarr Wilson, 48, YouTuber and technology reporter, as well as gaming-industry event host.
- November 23 – Udo Kier, 81, horror actor with multiple video game roles including Yuri from Command & Conquer: Red Alert 2.
- November 29 – Tomomichi Nishimura, 79, Japanese voice actor who voiced Akuma and M. Bison in the Street Fighter series.
- December 1 – Nick Thorpe, 38, the Features Editor and primary writer for long-running British gaming magazine Retro Gamer.
- December 4 – Cary-Hiroyuki Tagawa, 75, actor who portrayed Shang Tsung in Mortal Kombat and Heihachi Mishima in the Tekken films.
- December 10
  - Jeff Garcia, 50, actor and comedian who voiced Sheen Estevez in the Jimmy Neutron franchise.
  - Jim Ward, 66, voice actor who voiced Captain Qwark in the Ratchet & Clank series, Jack Krauser in Resident Evil 4 and Doktor in Metal Gear Rising: Revengeance.
- December 21 – Vince Zampella, 55, co-founder of Infinity Ward and Respawn Entertainment.
- December 25 – David M. Rosen, 95, co-founder of Sega and founding father of the Japan arcade scene.

== Hardware releases ==
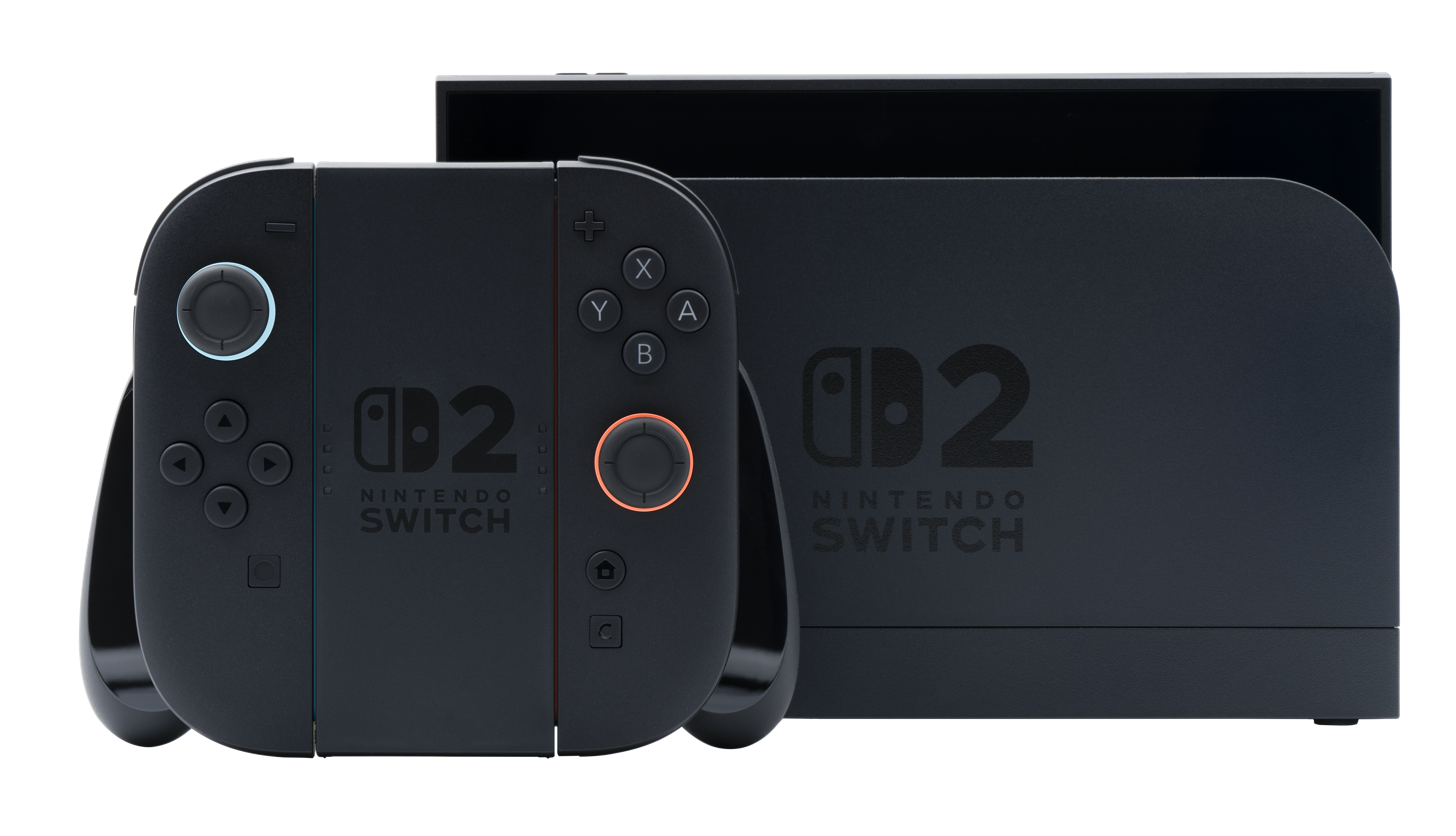
Nintendo Switch 2

Date	Console	Manufacturer	Ref.
January 15	MSI Claw 8 AI+	Micro-Star International	
February 14	Lenovo Legion Go S	Lenovo	
June 5	Nintendo Switch 2	Nintendo	
October 16	ROG Xbox Ally	Asus	
October 16	ROG Xbox Ally X	Asus	
October 21	Samsung Galaxy XR	Samsung	
October 31	Atari Gamestation Go	My Arcade	
October 31	Lenovo Legion Go 2	Lenovo	
December 5	Intellivision Sprint	Atari SA	

== Cancelled games ==
Title	Platform(s)	Genre(s)	Developer(s)	Publisher(s)	Month cancelled	Ref.
Earthblade	WIN	Action, Adventure	Extremely OK Games		January	
Transformers: Reactivate	WIN	Action	Splash Damage	Unknown	January	
Demis Re:Born	WIN, iOS, DROID	RPG	Netmarble F&C	Netmarble	February	
Football Manager 25	WIN, NS, iOS, DROID, PS5, XBO, XSX/S	Sports management	Sports Interactive	Sega	February	
Wonder Woman	WIN, PS5, XSX/S	Action	Monolith Productions	Warner Bros. Games	February	
Untitled Titanfall game	Unknown	FPS	Respawn Entertainment	Electronic Arts	April	(Note: Reported by Jason Schreier.)
Battle Aces	WIN	RTS	Uncapped Games		May	
Untitled Black Panther game	Unknown	Action-adventure	Cliffhanger Games	Electronic Arts	May	
Kingdom Hearts Missing-Link	iOS, DROID	Action RPG	Square Enix		May	
Project Bifrost	Unknown	Unknown	People Can Fly	Unknown	June	
Project Gemini	Unknown	Unknown	People Can Fly	Unknown	June	
Block N Load 2	WIN, PS4, PS5, XBO, XSX/S	FPS, Sandbox	Toadman Interactive		July	
Everwild	WIN, XSX/S	Action-adventure	Rare	Xbox Game Studios	July	(Note: Reported by VGC and Jason Schreier.)
Perfect Dark	WIN, XSX/S	FPS	The Initiative, Crystal Dynamics	Xbox Game Studios	July	
Project Blackbird	Unknown	MMORPG	ZeniMax Online Studios	Xbox Game Studios	July	
Contraband	WIN, XSX/S	Action-adventure	Avalanche Studios Group	Xbox Game Studios	August	(Note: Reported by Jason Schreier and Stephen Totilo.)
Hyper Light Breaker	WIN	Roguelike, Action-adventure	Heart Machine	Arc Games	October	
Postal: Bullet Paradise	WIN, OSX, LIN, NS, PS4, PS5	Bullet heaven, FPS	Goonswarm Games	Running With Scissors	December	

== Discontinued games ==
Title	Platform(s)	Genre(s)	Developer(s)	Publisher(s)	Shutdown date	Ref.
Alchemy Stars (Note: An offline version of the game is accessible for existing owners.)	iOS, DROID	Tactical RPG, Strategy	Tourdog Studio	Level Infinite	January 24, 2025	
The Simpsons: Tapped Out	iOS, DROID	City-building	Electronic Arts	EA Mobile	January 24, 2025	
The Elder Scrolls: Legends	WIN, OSX, iOS, DROID	DCCG	Dire Wolf Digital, Sparkypants Studios	Bethesda Softworks	January 30, 2025	
EA Sports UFC 3	PS4, XBO	Fighting, Sports	EA Vancouver	EA Sports	February 17, 2025	
Hood: Outlaws & Legends	WIN, PS4, PS5, XBO, XSX/S	Action	Sumo Newcastle	Focus Home Interactive	February 18, 2025	
Dungeons & Dragons: Dark Alliance	WIN, PS4, PS5, XBO, XSX/S	Action RPG	Tuque Games	Wizards of the Coast	February 24, 2025	
ArcheAge	WIN	MMORPG	XLGames		March 5, 2025	
NCAA Football 14	PS3, X360	Sports	EA Tiburon	EA Sports	March 13, 2025	
Spectre Divide	WIN, PS5, XSX/S	FPS	Mountaintop Studios		April 17, 2025	
Ember Sword	WIN, OSX	MMORPG, Sandbox	Bright Star Studios		May 21, 2025	
MapleStory 2	WIN	MMORPG	Nexon		May 29, 2025	
War of the Visions: Final Fantasy Brave Exvius (WW)	iOS, DROID	Tactical RPG	Square Enix, Gumi Inc	Square Enix	May 29, 2025	
Dauntless	WIN, NS, PS5, XBO, XSX/S	Action RPG	Phoenix Labs		May 30, 2025	
MultiVersus	WIN, PS4, PS5, XBO, XSX/S	Fighting	Player First Games	Warner Bros. Games	May 30, 2025	
XDefiant (Note: Also no longer available for download and player registration closed the same day.)	WIN, PS5, XSX/S	FPS	Ubisoft San Francisco	Ubisoft	June 3, 2025	
Defense Derby	iOS, DROID	Tower defense	Rising Wings	Krafton	June 13, 2025	
Madden NFL 21	WIN, PS4, PS5, XBO, XSX/S, Stadia	Sports	EA Tiburon	EA Sports	June 30, 2025	
Resident Evil Re:Verse	WIN, PS4, PS5, XBO, XSX/S	TPS, Horror	Capcom		June 30, 2025	
Block N Load	WIN	FPS, Sandbox	Jagex, Artplant	Jagex	August 1, 2025	
Gran Saga	WIN, iOS, DROID	MMORPG	Npixel		August 28, 2025	
Blacklight: Retribution	PS4	FPS	Zombie Studios, Hardsuit Labs	Perfect World Entertainment	August 31, 2025	
Skyforge	WIN	MMORPG	Allods Team, Obsidian Entertainment	My.com	September 3, 2025	
Star Wars: Hunters	WIN, NS, iOS, DROID	Action	Zynga, NaturalMotion	Zynga	October 1, 2025	
NHL 21	PS4, XBO	Sports	EA Vancouver	EA Sports	October 6, 2025	
Need for Speed Rivals	WIN, PS3, PS4, X360, XBO	Racing	Ghost Games, Criterion Games	Electronic Arts	October 7, 2025	
KartRider: Drift	WIN, PS4, XBO, iOS, DROID	Racing	Nitro Studio	Nexon	October 16, 2025	
Madden NFL 22	WIN, PS4, PS5, XBO, XSX/S, Stadia	Sports	EA Tiburon	EA Sports	October 20, 2025	
Skyforge	NS, PS4, XBO	MMORPG	Allods Team, Obsidian Entertainment	My.com	October 29, 2025	
Rust	PS4, XBO	Survival	Facepunch Studios, Double Eleven	Facepunch Studios	October 30, 2025	
FIFA 23	WIN, NS, PS4, PS5, XBO, XSX/S, Stadia	Sports	EA Vancouver, EA Romania	EA Sports	October 30, 2025	
Final Fantasy Brave Exvius (JP)	iOS, DROID, Amazon Fire	RPG	Alim	Square Enix	October 31, 2025	

== Video game-based film and television releases ==
Title	Release / premiere date	Type	Distributor(s)	Franchise(s)	Original game publisher(s)	Ref.
Grisaia: Phantom Trigger the Animation	January 2, 2025	Anime television series	Tokyo MX (Japan)	The Fruit of Grisaia	Frontwing	
Promise of Wizard	January 6, 2025	Anime television series	Tokyo MX (Japan)	Promise of Wizard	Coly	
Tasokare Hotel	January 8, 2025	Anime television series	Tokyo MX (Japan)	Tasokare Hotel	SEEC	
Farmagia	January 10, 2025	Anime television series	Tokyo MX (Japan)	Farmagia	Marvelous	
Colorful Stage! The Movie: A Miku Who Can't Sing	January 17, 2025	Anime film	Shochiku	Hatsune Miku: Colorful Stage!	Sega	
Devil May Cry	April 3, 2025	Adult animated television series	Netflix	Devil May Cry	Capcom	
A Minecraft Movie	April 4, 2025	Feature film	Warner Bros. Pictures	Minecraft	Mojang Studios	
Guilty Gear Strive: Dual Rulers	April 5, 2025	Anime television series	Tokyo MX (Japan)	Guilty Gear Strive	Arc System Works	
Summer Pockets	April 7, 2025	Anime television series	Tokyo MX (Japan)	Summer Pockets	Visual Arts	
Home Sweet Home Rebirth	April 11, 2025	Feature film	Vertical	Home Sweet Home	Yggdrazil Group	
Until Dawn	April 25, 2025	Feature film	Sony Pictures Releasing	Until Dawn	Sony Interactive Entertainment	
Kamitsubaki City Under Construction	July 3, 2025	Anime television series	TBS Television (Japan)	Kamitsubaki City Under Construction	Kamitsubaki Studio	
Arknights: Rise from Ember	July 4, 2025	Anime television series	Tokyo MX (Japan)	Arknights	Hypergryph (China); Yostar (worldwide)	
9-Nine: Ruler's Crown	July 5, 2025	Anime television series	Tokyo MX (Japan)	9-Nine	Palette	
Nukitashi the Animation	July 19, 2025	Anime television series	AT-X (Japan)	Nukitashi	Qruppo	
As One	August 22, 2025	Anime film	Gaga Corporation	Starwing Paradox	Square Enix	
Exit 8	August 29, 2025	Feature film	Toho	The Exit 8	Kotake Create	
Gnosia	October 12, 2025	Anime television series	Tokyo MX (Japan)	Gnosia	Petit Depotto	
Splinter Cell: Deathwatch	October 14, 2025	Adult animated television series	Netflix	Tom Clancy's Splinter Cell	Ubisoft	
Monster Strike: Deadverse Reloaded	October 21, 2025	Anime television series	Tokyo MX (Japan)	Monster Strike	Mixi	
Disney Twisted-Wonderland the Animation	October 29, 2025	Anime television series	Disney+	Disney Twisted-Wonderland	Aniplex	
Five Nights at Freddy's 2	December 5, 2025	Feature film	Universal Pictures	Five Nights at Freddy's	Scott Cawthon	
