= MSI Claw A1M =

Handheld gaming computer by MSI

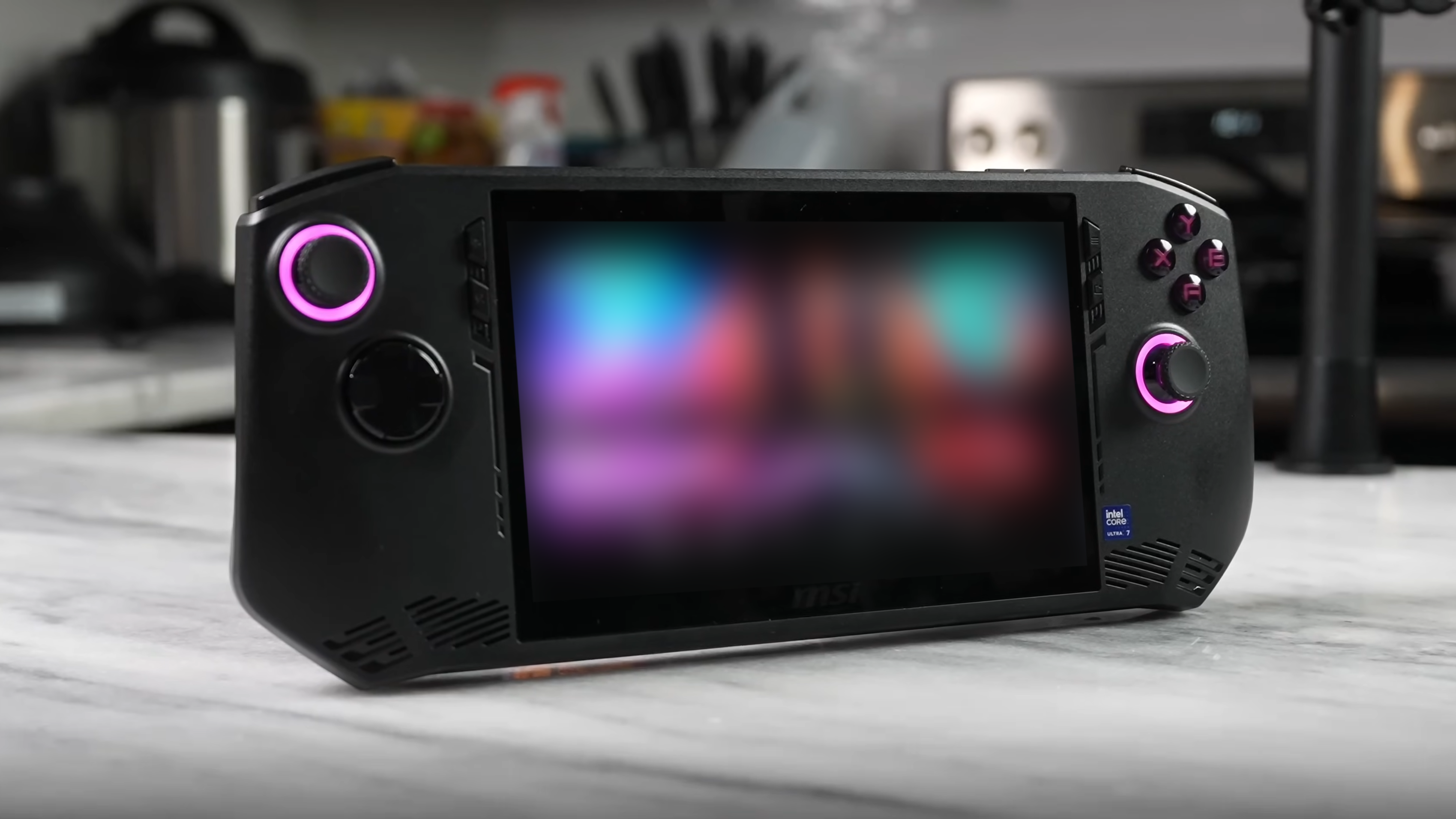
- MSI Claw A1M with illuminated sticks and buttons
- Developer: MSI
- Manufacturer: MSI
- Product family: Claw
- Type: Handheld game console, handheld gaming computer
- Released: WW: March 8, 2024; (512 GB, Intel Core Ultra 7 155H): WW: March 15, 2024; (1 TB, Intel Core Ultra 7 155H): WW: March 15, 2024; (512 GB, Intel Core Ultra 5 135H)
- Introductory price: US$699.99 (Intel Core Ultra 5 135H model-Claw A1M-021SG) (512 GB); US$749.99 (Intel Core Ultra 7 155H model-Claw A1M-051US) (512 GB); US$799.99 (Intel Core Ultra 7 155H model-Claw A1M-020SG) (1 TB)
- Media: Digital distribution
- Operating system: Windows 11 Home (Core Ultra 5 & 7 models) or Pro (Core Ultra 7 model only)
- CPU: Intel Core Ultra 5 135H (Note: Meteor Lake with 4 nm process, 14-cores/18-threads, 18 MB of L3 cache, 0.7 GHz to 4.60 GHz boost); Intel Core Ultra 7 155H (Note: Meteor Lake with 4 nm process, 16-cores/22-threads, 24 MB of L3 cache, 0.7 Ghz to 4.80 GHz boost)
- Memory: 16 GB LPDDR5-6400, dual-channel 64-bit (128-bit), 102.4 GB/s
- Storage: NVMe PCIe 4.0 x4 M.2 2230 512 GB (Core Ultra 5 & 7 models) or 1 TB (Core Ultra 7 model only) SSD (expandable)
- Removable storage: microSD/SDHC/SDXC via UHS-II
- Display: 7-inch, 1920 × 1080 FHD Touchscreen IPS LCD @ 120 Hz, 16:9, 500 nits (SDR) with 48-120 Hz with VRR
- Graphics: Intel Arc (Alchemist-based) Xe-HPG (high performance graphics), 8 Xe cores up to 2.2 GHz, up to 4.5 TFLOPS (Intel Core Ultra 5 135H) or up to 2.25 GHz, up to 4.6 TFLOPS (Intel Core Ultra 7 155H) (Note: each Xe core has 16 Xe Vector Engines or XVEs & each XVE has 8 ALUs)
- Sound: 2 × 2W stereo speakers, hi-res audio ready
- Input: RGB ABXY buttons; 2× RGB Hall-effect analog sticks; D-pad; L & R Hall-effect analog triggers; L & R bumpers; View button; Menu button; MSI center M button; QuicksSettings button; Macro button (M1/M2); HD haptics; Armoury crate button; Volume +/− buttons; Power button with fingerprint scanner
- Touchpad: Touch screen (10-point multi-touch)
- Connectivity: Bluetooth 5.4, Intel Killer BE1750 Wi-Fi Tri-band 2.4, 5 & 6 GHz 7, 1x USB-C port with Thunderbolt 4, USB4 & DisplayPort 1.4 alt-modes & Power Delivery 3.0, 1x 3.5 mm combo audio jack
- Power: 6-cell, li-polymer, 53Whr / 65W USB Type-C PD 3.0
- Dimensions: 294(W) × 117(D) × 21.2(H) mm (11.6(W) × 4.6(D) × 0.8(H) inches)
- Weight: 675 grams (1.488 lb)
- Successor: MSI Claw A8
- Website: Official website

The MSI Claw A1M is a handheld gaming computer developed by Micro-Star International (MSI), released in March 2024.

== Technical features ==
It has a 7-inch 120HZ LCD IPS display, and is powered by a Meteor Lake-based Intel Core Ultra 5 135H or Ultra 7 155H, with 8 Xe GPU cores and 14 CPU cores (4 performance + 10 efficiency, 135H) or 16 CPU cores (6 performance + 10 efficiency, 155H). Other hardware includes a 53 watt-hour Li-ion battery and 16 GB of RAM, based on information from previews.

The Claw comes with Wi-Fi, two speakers, a Thunderbolt 4-capable USB Type-C port, HDMI output and an audio jack. It runs with Microsoft's Windows 11 and MSI Android App player. It weighs 675 grams and has a black outer coating.

== Reception ==
The device was criticized by reviewers for high power draw and lower performance than competing handheld PCs.

Wired called the hardware outdated and battery life poor next to competitors.

== See also ==
- Asus ROG Ally
- Lenovo Legion Go
- Logitech G Cloud
- Nintendo Switch
- Nintendo Switch 2
- Nvidia Shield Portable
- Nvidia Shield Tablet
- Razer Edge
- Steam Deck
