= ROG Xbox Ally =

Handheld gaming computer by ASUS

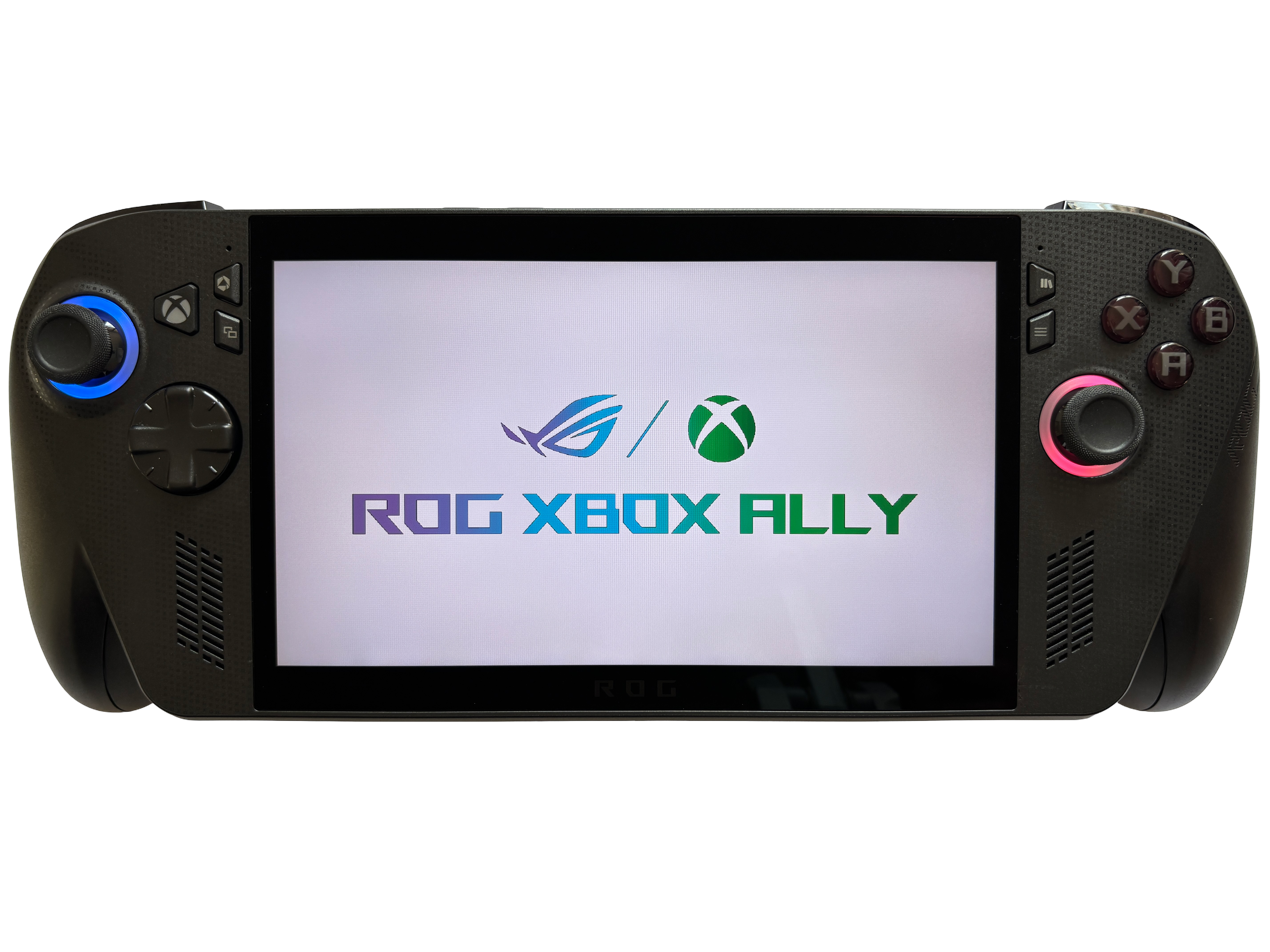
- ROG Xbox Ally X
- Codename: "Project Kennan"
- Developer: Asus; Microsoft
- Manufacturer: Asus
- Product family: ROG, Xbox
- Type: Handheld PC
- Released: October 16, 2025 (See Release section for details)
- Operating system: Windows 11 Home
- CPU: AMD Ryzen; Ally: Z2 A Ally X: AI Z2 Extreme
- Memory: (Ally: 16 GB LPDDR5; Ally X: 24 GB LPDDR5X)
- Storage: M.2 SSD; Ally: 512 GB; Ally X: 1 TB
- Display: 7" IPS, Full HD (1920x1080 pixels), 500 nits, 120Hz refresh rate
- Graphics: ASUS ROG Xbox Ally X: 16 CUs at 2.7 GHz, 5.530 TFLOPS; ASUS ROG Xbox Ally: 8 CUs at 1.6 GHz, 1.638 TFLOPS
- Connectivity: Wi-Fi 6E (2 x 2); Bluetooth 5.4
- Dimensions: 290.8 × 121.5 × 50.7 mm (11.4 × 4.8 × 2 inches)
- Weight: Ally: 670g (1.5 lbs); Ally X: 715g (1.6 lbs)
- Predecessor: Asus ROG Ally
- Website: rog.asus.com/content/rog-xbox-ally

The ROG Xbox Ally and ROG Xbox Ally X are handheld gaming computers co-developed by Asus and Microsoft, and manufactured by Asus as part of the Republic of Gamers (ROG) and Xbox brands. Serving as a successor to the Asus ROG Ally, it was released on October 16, 2025.

Similarly to other devices in its class, it is a handheld console-like device with a 7-inch touchscreen display and integrated gamepad controls; the two models are differentiated primarily by internal specifications, with the ROG Xbox Ally using a quad-core AMD Ryzen Z2 APU, and the high-end Ally X featuring the octa-core Ryzen AI Z2 Extreme and an increased amount of RAM and internal storage.

== History ==
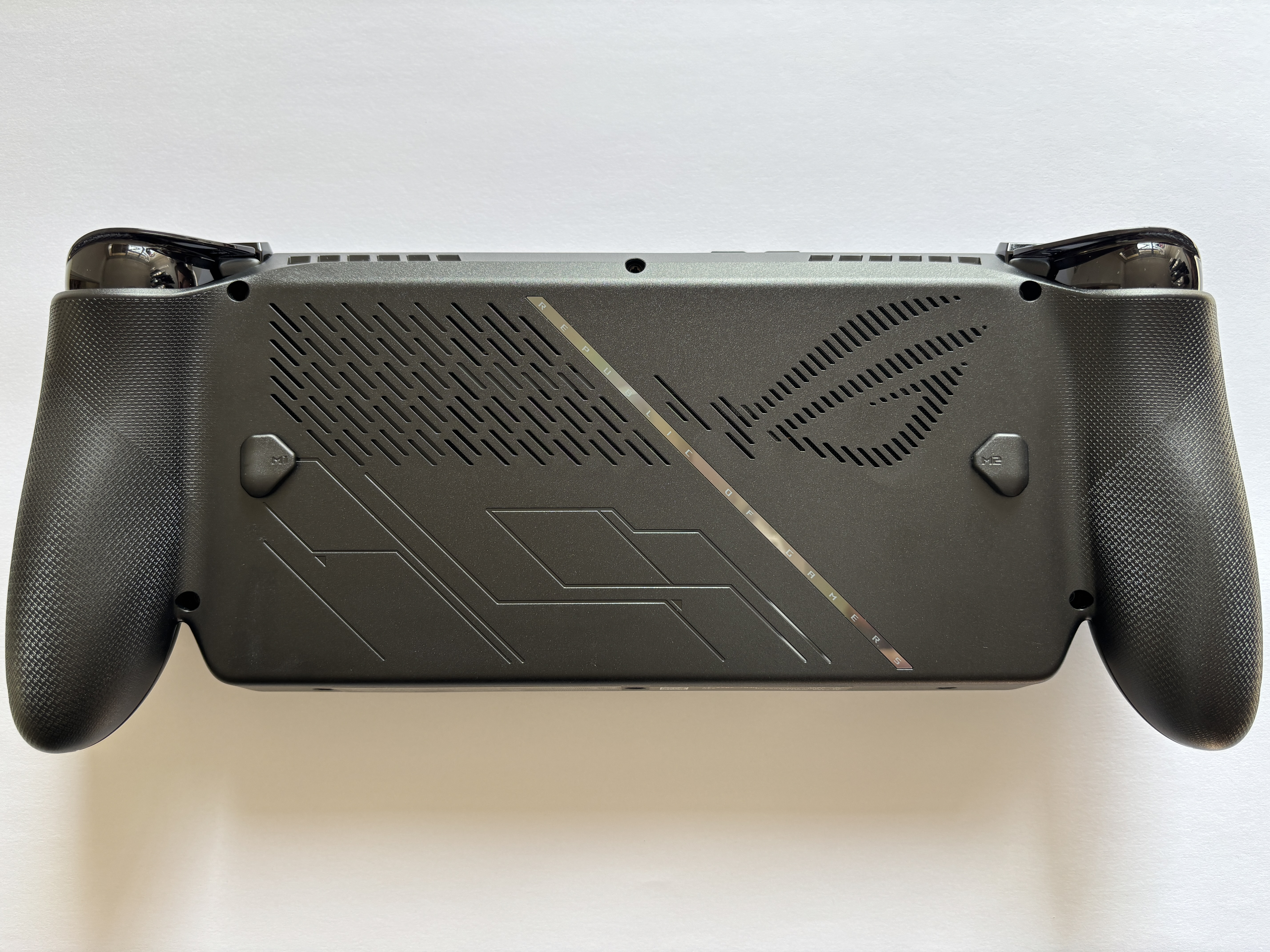
ROG Xbox Ally X

Images of the device, then known under the codename "Project Kennan" (and referred to by some outlets as the "Asus ROG Ally 2", under the presumption that it was a Microsoft-branded variant of an ROG Ally successor), were leaked by the U.S. Federal Communications Commission (FCC) in May 2025 as part of its certification process.

The device was officially unveiled during Microsoft's annual Xbox Games Showcase presentation on June 8, 2025. Prior to the announcement, Windows Central reported that Microsoft had allegedly cancelled a planned first-party Xbox handheld console in favor of focusing on "Project Kennan", as well as optimizations to Windows 11 to better support gaming handhelds. The device's marketing featured Hollow Knight: Silksong prominently; the game was available on the device upon launch.

The handheld devices were revealed on August 20, 2025 at gamescom 2025 in Cologne, Germany. It was also hosted by Grand Theft Auto V character actors, Ned Luke and Shawn Fonteno at the ROG booth.

With the start of pre-orders on September 25, 2025, the prices in the European Union were officially confirmed: €599 (US$599.99) for the standard version (ROG Xbox Ally) and €899 (US$999.99) for the higher-end ROG Xbox Ally X.

== Specifications ==
The ROG Xbox Ally was released in two models; both models feature AMD Ryzen Z2 APUs, with the low-end Ally featuring a Ryzen Z2 A (a quad-core processor based on Zen 2 microarchitecture with eight RDNA 2 graphics cores), and the Ally X featuring the Ryzen AI Z2 Extreme (an octa-core processor based on Zen 5 microarchitecture with sixteen RDNA 3.5 shaper graphics cores and a neural processing unit). The two models feature 16 GB of LPDDR5 and 24 GB of LPDDR5X RAM respectively, and have 512 GB and 1 TB of internal storage respectively. Both models use a 7-inch, 120 Hz 1080p IPS LCD with variable refresh rate. Use of an OLED screen was considered, but rejected because of concerns for power draw when combined with variable refresh rate.

The devices ship with Windows 11; they are the first Windows devices to support Xbox mode, which boots the system directly into the Xbox app without loading the full Windows shell by default. The mode provides a console-like experience with less resource and power consumption, with Microsoft estimating savings of up to 2 GB of memory and a two-thirds reduction of idle power consumption. This mode was a timed exclusive to Asus ROG devices on launch, and began to be released for other Windows 11 devices in April 2026. The Windows user interface also received additional features designed to improve navigation on game controllers, including additional system settings available from Game Bar, controller support on the lock screen, and a new task switcher design.

=== Alternative operating systems ===
Like the ROG Ally, the ROG Xbox Ally saw experimentation from users seeking to change the operating system. An analysis found that switching from Windows 11 to the Linux distribution Bazzite greatly increased performance, with Kingdom Come Deliverance 2 seeing framerates increase by 32% and increased stability. On Bazzite the device was also faster to wake up from a sleep state.

Properties	Xbox Ally	Xbox Ally X
Price	$599.99 USD/ €599	$999.99 USD/ €899
Controls	ABXY buttons / D-pad / L & R Hall Effect analog triggers / L & R bumpers / Xbox button / View button / Menu button / Command Center button / Library button / 2x assignable back buttons / 2x full-size analog sticks / HD haptics / 6-Axis IMU	ABXY buttons / D-pad / L & R impulse triggers / L & R bumpers / Xbox button / View button / Menu button / Command Center button / Library button / 2x assignable back buttons / 2x full-size analog sticks / HD haptics / 6-Axis IMU
Processors	AMD Ryzen Z2 A	AMD Ryzen AI Z2 Extreme
Memory	16 GB LPDDR5-6400	24 GB LPDDR5X-8000
Storage	512 GB M.2 2280 SSD	1TB M.2 2280 SSD
Display	7" FHD (1080p) IPS, 500 nits, 16:9 120 Hz refresh rate/AMD FreeSync Premium (Variable Refresh Rate)/Corning Gorilla Glass Victus + DXC Anti-Reflection	7" FHD (1080p) IPS, 500 nits, 16:9 120 Hz refresh rate/AMD FreeSync Premium (Variable Refresh Rate)/Corning Gorilla Glass Victus + DXC Anti-Reflection
IO Ports	2x USB 3.2 Gen 2 type-C with DisplayPort 1.4 and USB Power Delivery 3.0 1x UHS-II microSD card reader (supports SD, SDXC and SDHC) 1x 3.5mm headset jack	1x USB4 type-C with DisplayPort 2.1, USB Power Delivery 3.0, and Thunderbolt 4 1x USB 3.2 Gen 2 type-C with DisplayPort 2.1 and Power Delivery 3.0 1x UHS-II microSD card reader (supports SD, SDXC and SDHC; UHS-I with DDR200 mode) 1x 3.5mm headset jack
Network and Communication	Mediatek MT7922 Wi-Fi 6E (2 x 2) + Bluetooth 5.4	Mediatek MT7922 Wi-Fi 6E (2 x 2) + Bluetooth 5.4
Dimensions	290.8*121.5*50.7mm, 670g	290.8*121.5*50.7mm, 715g
Battery	60Wh	80Wh

== Release ==
Pre-orders were available in 31 countries (See History section for details). The ROG Xbox Ally will be released for New Zealand and ROG Xbox Ally X for Switzerland. It was released globally up to 45 countries.

On November 19, 2025, ASUS Brazil initially announced the pre-orders on November 21, 2025 at 10 a.m. (local time). In Chinese markets, the release of the standard version of the ROG Xbox Ally was delayed to early 2026.

Availability by region for the ROG Xbox Ally (2025)
Date	Country list
October 16, 2025	Australia, Belgium, Canada, Czech Republic, Denmark, Egypt, Finland, France, Germany, Greece, Hong Kong, Hungary, India, Indonesia, Ireland, Italy, Japan, Malaysia, Mexico, Netherlands, New Zealand, Norway, Philippines, Poland, Portugal, South Korea, Romania, Saudi Arabia, Singapore, Slovenia, South Africa, Spain, Sweden, Switzerland, Taiwan, Turkey, United Arab Emirates, Ukraine, United Kingdom, United States, Vietnam
December 1, 2025	Brazil
Sources: XBOX Wire Website

== See also ==
- Lenovo Legion Go
- Logitech G Cloud
- MSI Claw A1M
- Nintendo Switch
- Nintendo Switch 2
- PlayStation Portal
- Razer Edge
- Steam Deck
