= Lenovo Legion Go =

Handheld gaming computer by Lenovo

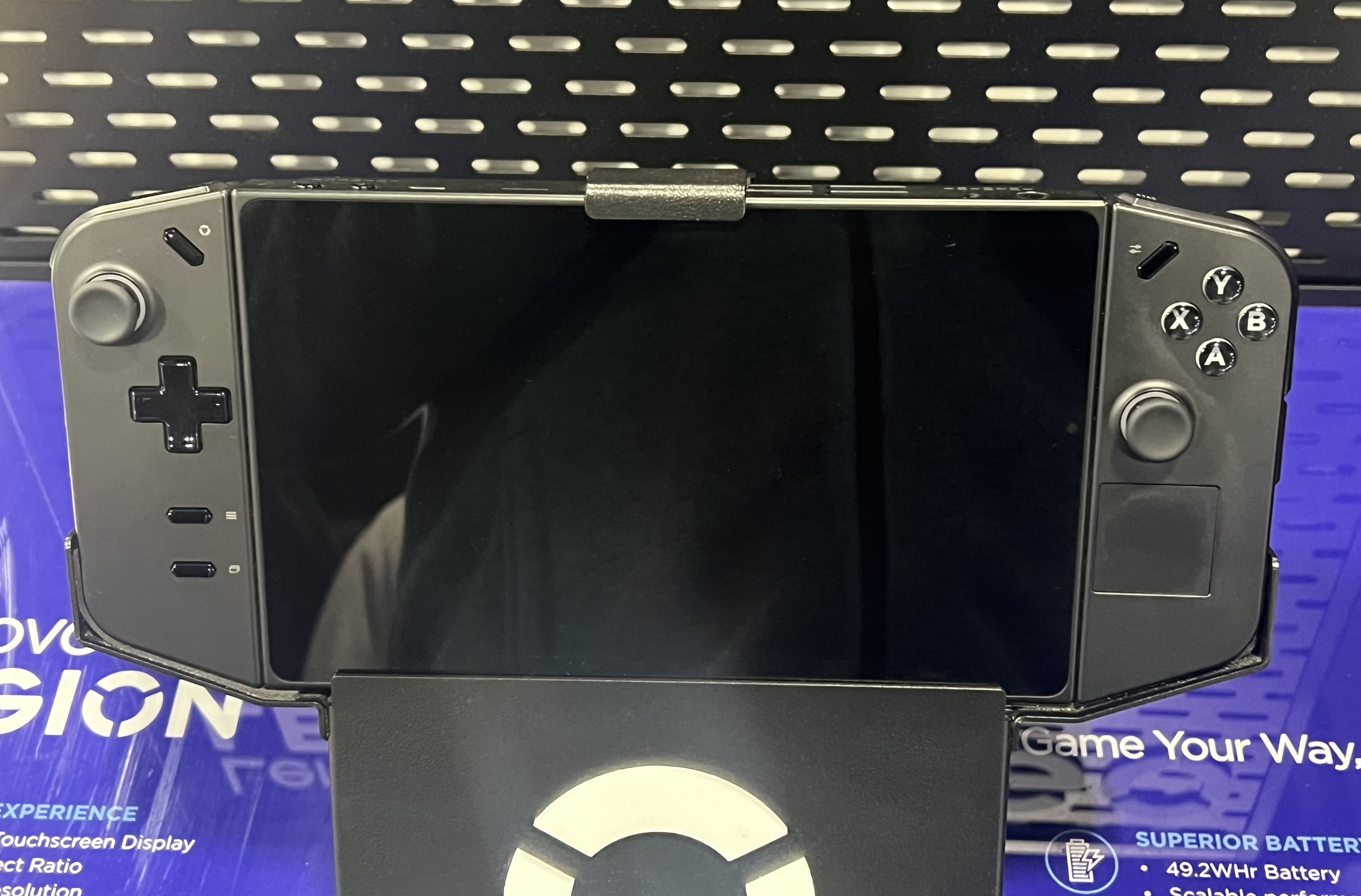
- Lenovo's portable gaming PC "Legion Go" on display at an electronics retailer
- Developer: Lenovo
- Manufacturer: Lenovo
- Product family: Legion
- Type: Handheld gaming computer
- Released: WW: October 31, 2023
- Introductory price: US$599.99 (Ryzen Z1 model) (256 GB); US$699.99 (Ryzen Z1 Extreme model) (512 GB); US$749.99 (Ryzen Z1 Extreme model) (1 TB)
- Media: Digital distribution
- Operating system: Windows 11 Home (64-bit)
- CPU: AMD Ryzen Z1 (Note: Zen 4 with 4 nm process, 6-cores/12-threads, 22 MB cache, up to 4.90 GHz boost); AMD Ryzen Z1 Extreme (Note: Zen 4 with 4 nm process, 8-cores/16-threads, 24 MB cache, up to 5.10 GHz boost)
- Memory: 16 GB LPDDR5X-7500, Dual-channel 64-bit (128-bit), 120.0 GB/s
- Storage: 256/512 GB & 1 TB NVMe M.2 2242 PCIe 4.0 x4 TLC SSD
- Removable storage: microSD/SDHC/SDXC via UHS-II
- Display: 8.8-inch, 2560 × 1600 QHD Touchscreen IPS LCD @ 144 Hz 500 nits (SDR), 16:10 aspect ratio, corning gorilla glass 5
- Graphics: AMD RDNA 3, 4 CUs, up to 2.5 GHz, up to 2.56 TFLOPS (Note: Only when utilizing dual-issue instructions; de facto performance ~1.28 TFLOPS) (256 GB model) AMD RDNA 3, 12 CUs, up to 2.7 GHz, up to 8.29 TFLOPS (Note: Only when utilizing dual-issue instructions; de facto performance ~4.14 TFLOPS) (512 GB/1 TB model)
- Sound: Stereo speakers with Dolby Atmos & dual-array microphone
- Input: 2 × analog sticks; 2 × shoulder buttons (LB, RB); 2 × analog triggers (LT, RT); 4 × grip buttons (M1, M2); D-pad; A/B/X/Y buttons; View/Menu buttons; Quick Settings button; Legion Space button; Volume +/− buttons; Power button
- Touchpad: Touch Screen (10-point multi-touch)
- Connectivity: Bluetooth 5.3, Wi-Fi Tri-band 2.4, 5 & 6 Ghz 6E, 2× USB-C port with USB4 & DisplayPort 1.4 alt-modes & Power Delivery 3.0, 1x 3.5mm combo audio jack, 1x Card reader, 2x Pogo pin connector (5-point)
- Power: 49.2 Wh Lithium-ion battery 4S1P, 2-cell
- Dimensions: Base Module: 20.1mm x 210mm x 131mm / .79″ x 8.27″ x 5.16″ Base Module w/ Controllers: 40.7mm x 298.83mm x 131mm / 1.60″ x 11.76″ x 5.16″
- Weight: 650 grams (1.43 lb) (w/o controllers) 854 grams (1.883 lb) (w/ controllers)
- Website: https://www.lenovo.com/us/en/p/handheld/legion-go/len106g0001

The Lenovo Legion Go is a handheld gaming computer developed by Lenovo and released in October 2023, as part of their Lenovo Legion line. The device ships with Microsoft's Windows 11 and with the Legion Space game launcher.

== Technology ==
It has an 8.8 inch touch screen. Its CPU is an Ryzen Z1 APU chipset with RDNA integrated graphics. It has 16GB of 7500Mhz LPDDR5X RAM & 256GB - 1 TB of PCIe Gen4 SSD storage, hall effect analog sticks and a 49.2-watt-hour battery. Its starting cost is US$599.99 at launch. The display is a QHD+ screen with a 2560×1600 resolution, 16:10 ratio, 144 Hz and 500 nits. There is an accessory line-up for the product, including VR glasses, surround sound wired headphones and a backpack. It is supplied with a carrying case, a power adapter, a controller base‌ and an Xbox Game Pass. It weighs 854 g with controllers and 650 g without them. Its cooling component features a liquid-crystal polymer 79-blade fan.

In January 2025, Lenovo unveiled the Legion Go 2 as the successor to the Legion Go at CES 2025 with packing up to AMD Ryzen™ Z2 Extreme processor, with up to AMD's Zen 5 CPU (up to 8 cores/16 threads) and RDNA 3.5-based Radeon™ 890M graphics, It was released in October 2025.

== Reception ==
Gizmodo wrote that because of the Windows 11 software and the size of the handheld, it is at a disadvantage. Still, they called it innovative and powerful.

== See also ==
- Asus ROG Ally - Windows based handheld gaming device
- Logitech G Cloud - Android based handheld gaming device
- MSI Claw A1M - Handheld gaming device
- Nintendo Switch - Handheld gaming console
- Nintendo Switch 2 - Handheld gaming console
- Nvidia Shield Portable - Handheld gaming console
- Nvidia Shield Tablet - Handheld gaming tablet
- Razer Edge - Android based handheld gaming device
- Steam Deck - SteamOS based handheld gaming device
- Ultra-mobile PC
