= Steam Deck =

Handheld gaming computer by Valve

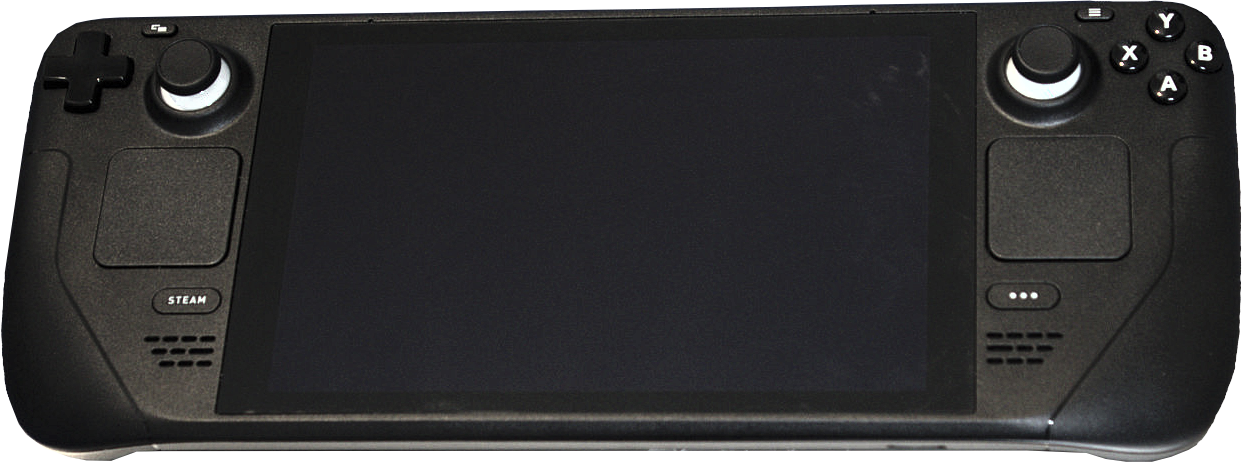
- Front side of the LCD model
- Developer: Valve Corporation
- Type: Handheld gaming computer
- Released: NA: February 25, 2022; EU: February 25, 2022; AS: December 17, 2022; WW: November 16, 2023 (OLED); AU: November 19, 2024
- Introductory price: US$399–649; €419–679
- Discontinued: LCD: December 19, 2025
- Media: Digital distribution
- Operating system: SteamOS
- System on a chip: AMD "Van Gogh" APU: LCD: 7nm "Aerith" (TSMC N7); OLED: 6nm "Sephiroth" (TSMC N6)
- CPU: Quad-core Zen 2 with 8 threads @ 2.4–3.5 GHz
- Memory: LCD: 16 GB unified LPDDR5-5500 @ 5500 MT/s (88 GB/s); OLED: 16 GB unified LPDDR5X-8533 @ 6400 MT/s (102.4 GB/s)
- Storage: LCD: 64 GB eMMC, 256 GB or 512 GB NVMe SSD (PCIe 3.0 x4); OLED: 512 GB or 1 TB NVMe SSD (PCIe 3.0 x4)
- Removable storage: microSD
- Display: LCD: 7", 1280×800p touchscreen IPS LCD (215ppi) @ 60 Hz, 400 nits; OLED: 7.4", 1280×800p touchscreen HDR OLED (204ppi) @ 90 Hz, 1,000 nits
- Graphics: RDNA 2 w/ 8x CUs @ 1–1.6 GHz (1–1.6 TFLOPS FP32).
- Sound: Stereo speakers from DSP, Headphone jack
- Input: 2 × clickable analog sticks with capacitive touch (L3, R3); 2 × pressure sensitive touchpads; 23 × buttons (A/B/X/Y, D-pad, 2 × shoulder [L1, R1], 2 × analog triggers [L2, R2], 4 × grip [L4, R4, L5, R5], View, Menu, Steam, Quick Access, Volume +/−, Power); 6 axis IMU (3 axis accelerometer, 3 axis gyroscope); Microphone; Ambient light sensor
- Connectivity: USB-C port with USB 3.2 Gen 2 and DisplayPort 1.4 modes; LCD: Bluetooth 5.0, Wi-Fi 5 (2.4 & 5 GHz); OLED: Bluetooth 5.3, WiFi 6E (2.4, 5, & 6 GHz)
- Power: Lithium-ion battery; LCD: 40 Wh, 5200 mAh; OLED: 50 Wh, 6470 mAh; APU power draw: 3–15W
- Online services: Steam
- Dimensions: 298 × 117 × 49 mm (11.7 × 4.6 × 1.9 in)
- Weight: LCD: 669 g (23.6 oz); OLED: 640 g (23 oz)
- Website: steamdeck.com

The Steam Deck is a handheld gaming computer produced by Valve Corporation, designed to run games available on its Steam storefront. Built upon the experiences gained from Valve's earlier ventures with the original 2015 Steam Machine and the Steam Controller, the Steam Deck integrates a custom AMD APU and SteamOS, a Linux-based operating system. The Steam Deck represents Valve's pivot towards a fully in-house hardware development approach, following the challenges faced with Steam Machines' reliance on OEMs and the requirement for native Linux game support.

Since its release in February 2022, the Steam Deck has garnered significant attention for its widespread adoption and versatility, including support for both native Linux games and those running through Proton, a compatibility layer for Windows games. Additionally, the Steam Deck features a desktop mode and allows users to install third-party Linux applications. The device has seen multiple revisions, including the introduction of OLED screen models in November 2023. Despite criticism regarding battery life, the Steam Deck has achieved notable commercial success, selling millions of units and influencing the market with its approach to portable gaming, and has spurred interest in similar handheld gaming computers.

== History ==
Valve's Steam Machine series of gaming computers using Linux-based SteamOS was introduced in 2015, which worked their way into the conception of the Steam Deck. Valve quietly pulled back on it by April 2018, but stated they remained committed to providing some type of open-hardware platform. Steam Deck designer Scott Dalton said "there was always kind of this classic chicken and egg problem with the Steam Machine", as it required the adoption of Linux by both players and game developers to reach a critical interest in the machines to draw manufacturers in making them. The lack of Linux game availability during the lifetime of Steam Machines led Valve to invest development into Proton, a Linux compatibility layer to allow Windows–based games to be run on Linux without modification.

Some of the early prototypes of Valve's Steam Controller, also released in 2015, included a small LCD screen within the middle of the controller which could be programmed as a second screen alongside the game that the user was playing. One idea from this prototype was to include the Steam Link, a device capable of streaming game content from a computer running Steam to a different monitor, here routing that output to the small LCD on the controller. This was later considered by Valve a very early concept behind the Steam Deck. Furthermore, their experience with trying to convince other manufacturers to produce Steam Machines led Valve to realize that it was better to develop all their hardware internally. Dalton said, "More and more it just became kind of clear, the more of this we are doing internally, the more we can kind of make a complete package." Rumors that Valve was working on a portable gaming unit had emerged in May 2021, based on updates made within the Steam code pointing towards a new "SteamPal" device, and comments made by Gabe Newell related to Valve developing games for consoles. Ars Technica was able to confirm that new hardware was in development at Valve.

Valve revealed the Steam Deck on July 15, 2021. The Deck, existing in three different models based on internal storage options, was shipped starting in February 2022 in North America and Europe, with other regions to follow throughout the year. Valve's CEO, Gabe Newell, said of the Steam Deck's approach, "As a gamer, this is a product I've always wanted. And as a game developer, it's the mobile device I've always wanted for our partners." According to Newell, they wanted to be "very aggressive" on the release and pricing strategy as they considered the mobile market as their primary competitor for the Deck. However, their focus was on the unit's performance; Newell stated, "But the first thing was the performance and the experience, [that] was the biggest and most fundamental constraint that was driving this." Newell recognized that the base pricing was somewhat lower than expected and "painful", but necessary to meet the expectation of gamers who would want the Deck. Newell continued that he believed this was a new product category of personal computer hardware that Valve and other computer manufacturers would continue to participate in if the Steam Deck proved successful, and thus it was necessary to keep the unit's price point reasonable to demonstrate viability. The openness of the system was also a key feature according to Newell, as that is a defining "superpower" of the personal computer space over typical console systems. Newell did not want to have any limitations on what the end user could do with the hardware, such as installing alternate non-Steam software on it.

As early as December 2022, Valve was pursuing improvements on the Steam Deck, including per-game "power profiles", and some other performance improvements, as well as evaluating a second generation Steam Deck. Valve was also considering bringing some of the Steam Deck technology into a new Steam Controller 2. Valve announced two new Deck models to be available for purchase in November 2023, both with OLED screens, extended battery capacity, and improved cooling features, among other hardware modifications to improve connectivity and efficiency; however, no changes were made to the Deck's overall performance. These models replace two of the existing models. Hardware designers for Valve stated that they would have wanted to include OLED screens for the original launch models, but at the time, OLED screens of sufficient size and quality did not yet exist on the market, and they would have had to delay release by 12 to 18 months if they went on that route. Alongside the announcement of the OLED models, Valve stated they are working towards a Steam Deck 2 with overall system improvements including the CPU and GPU chips, but these systems will likely not be ready for two to three years. System designer Lawrence Yang said they wanted to wait for a "generational leap" of CPUs with better computing power without significant power requirement increases before implementing a new version of the Steam Deck; this was reiterated by Valve's software engineer Pierre-Loup Griffais in discussing the newly-announced Steam Frame and second-generation Steam Machine and Steam Controller in November 2025, saying "We're not interested in getting to a point where it's 20 or 30 or even 50% more performance at the same battery life. We want something a little bit more demarcated than that. So we've been working back from silicon advancements and architectural improvements, and I think we have a pretty good idea of what the next version of Steam Deck is going to be, but right now there's no offerings in that landscape, in the SoC landscape, that we think would truly be a next-gen performance Steam Deck." In the midst of the global RAM shortage in 2026, Valve said they were still working towards a Steam Deck successor, but would still be predicated on "a very delineated performance improvement" in components before they would release it.

== Hardware ==
=== LCD models ===
The original Steam Deck was launched in February 2022 and included a custom AMD APU based on their Zen 2 and RDNA 2 architectures, named Aerith, after the Final Fantasy VII character Aerith Gainsborough. The CPU runs a four-core/eight-thread unit and the GPU runs on eight compute units with a total estimated performance of 1.6 TFLOPS. Both the CPU and GPU use variable timing frequencies, with the CPU running between 2.4 and 3.5 GHz and the GPU between 1.0 and 1.6 GHz based on current processor needs. The chip is made on the 7nm manufacturing process node by TSMC. The total size of the die is 163 mm². Valve stated that the CPU has comparable performance to Ryzen 3000 desktop computer processors and the GPU performance to the Radeon RX 6000 series. The Deck includes 16 GB of LPDDR5 RAM in a quad-channel configuration, with a total bandwidth of 88 GB/s.

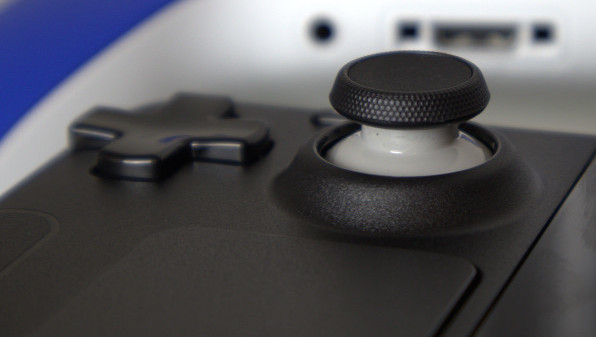
Close view of the Steam Deck directional pad, thumbstick, and portion of trackpad

The Deck's main unit is designed for handheld use. It includes a 7-inch (180 mm) touchscreen LCD with a 1280×800 pixel resolution with a fixed 60 Hz refresh rate; games are configured to use vertical synchronization where possible. The unit's input set features two thumbsticks, a directional pad, ABXY buttons, two shoulder buttons on each side of the unit, four additional buttons on the rear of the unit, as well as two trackpads under each thumbstick. The thumbsticks and trackpads use capacitive sensing, and the unit further includes a gyroscope to allow for more specialized controls on the handheld mode. The unit also includes haptic feedback.

The Deck supports Bluetooth connectivity for input devices, including common game controllers, and includes integrated WiFi network support to meet IEEE 802.11a/b/g/n/ac standards, stereo sound out via a digital signal processor, an integrated microphone and a headphone jack, a 40 watt-hour battery, which Valve estimates that for "lighter use cases like game streaming, smaller 2D games, or web browsing" can last between seven and eight hours. Valve also estimated that by keeping frame rates to around 30 frames per second (FPS) more intensive games such as Portal 2 could be played for five to six hours. The system's software includes an optional FPS limiter that balance a game's performance to optimize battery life. At release, Steam Decks were only manufactured in a black casing to reduce the complexity of production, though Valve stated that they have considered introducing other case colors or themes in the future. Valve partnered with iFixit to provide replacement parts for users.

The unit shipped in three models based on internal storage options. The base model includes a 64 GB eMMC internal storage unit, running over PCI Express 2.0 x1. A mid-tier model includes 256 GB of storage through an NVMe SSD device, while the high-end unit includes a 512 GB NVMe SSD storage unit, with the latter two both shipping with drives that run PCI Express 3.0 x4. All 3 SKUs use the same M.2 2230 interface for internal storage. Valve stated that the built-in storage is not meant to be replaceable by end-users, though can be replaced as necessary for repair. Additional storage space is available through a microSD card slot, which also supports microSDXC and microSDHC formats.

As Valve considered options for bringing a handheld device to market, they set a priority that the device had to be able to play nearly the entirety of the Steam game catalogue, and rejected possible hardware that moved away from the standard x86-based processing structure that would have been easier to implement in handheld form but would have limited what games would be available. Only through recent discussions with AMD and their current product lines was Valve able to identify a technical approach that would meet the goal of a handheld device capable of playing all Steam games without overtaxing the processor unit. The developers considered the Steam Deck to be future-proof. While the specifications are modest compared to high-end gaming computers, they felt that the performance was at a good place that would be acceptable for many years, while still looking at newer software improvements, such as the addition of AMD's FidelityFX Super Resolution (FSR). Though they do not have any current designs for a successor, Valve stated that there would likely be future iterations of the hardware in years to come, but the company expects the timing of releases to depend on the current state of processor technology and handheld device limitations rather than a regular upgrade cycle.

After the Steam Deck OLED was announced on November 9, 2023, the 64 GB LCD and 512 GB LCD models were discontinued. The two discontinued models received price cuts and would be sold until the beginning of December 2024, when they received a further price cut and stock ran out.

Around December 20, 2025, the remaining 256 GB LCD model was quietly discontinued, with a similar note that production had ended and that it would continue to be available until stock ran out. Around February 17, 2026, stock ran out for the 256 GB LCD model (as well as both OLED models).

=== OLED models ===
View of the hardware inside an OLED model from the back

Two new models were released on November 16, 2023, the 512 GB OLED and the 1 TB OLED. The 64 GB LCD and 512 GB LCD original units were discontinued, with the 256 GB LCD version becoming the new base model. The new base and flagship models (256 GB LCD and 1 TB OLED) were priced the same as the old base and flagship models (64 GB LCD and 512 GB LCD).

The new model upgrades include a larger 7.4 inches (19 cm) OLED 90 Hz display, Wi-Fi 6E and Bluetooth 5.3 support, a battery with an estimated 25% improvement in capacity, and improved cooling. The OLED Deck includes a revised APU based on 6 nm processor production named Sephiroth, named for the Final Fantasy VII character. In addition, a limited edition of the 1 TB model was released in North America exclusively, which has translucent plastic casing and selected orange-colored components. Another limited edition version of the Steam Deck OLED arrived in November 18th 2024, featuring a white with grey accent color pathway.

Since early 2026, availability of the newer Steam Deck models was low or out of stock in several regions, attributed to the global memory supply shortage. On May 27, 2026, Valve increased the prices for both the 512GB and 1TB OLED models to $789 and $949 respectively, due to increasing component costs as well as global logistical challenges.

=== Dock unit ===
A dock unit was released on October 6, 2022. The dock unit can be connected to an external power source to power the Deck, and to an external monitor via either HDMI or DisplayPort protocols to route output from the Deck to that monitor. Though limited by the processor speed, the display output from the Deck via the dock can reach as high as 8k resolution at 60 Hz or 4k resolution at 120 Hz; this resolution boost can also be achieved by attaching the Deck directly through a USB to HDMI adapter without the use of the docking station. There is no other change in performance of the Steam Deck whether docked or when used in portable mode. With SteamOS update 3.5.5, the dock unit was also made to support variable refresh rate monitors. The dock has a Gigabit Ethernet port and three USB-A 3.1 Gen 1 ports for connecting peripherals. The Deck can also work with any third-party docking station that supports similar types of interfacing for portable devices. External GPUs are not officially supported, although testing via the M2 slot has demonstrated that eGPUs are capable of running when connected to the Deck.

== Software ==
=== Operating system ===
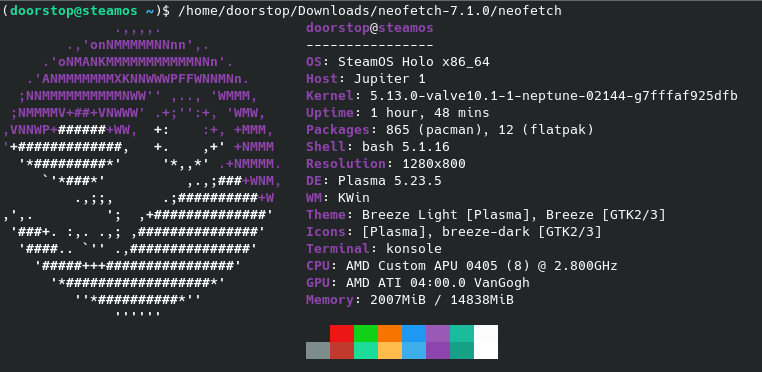
Screenshot of Neofetch showing Steam Deck specification

Steam Deck runs SteamOS version 3, based on the Arch Linux operating system. While SteamOS had been previously developed for Steam Machines using Debian Linux, Valve stated that they wanted to use a rolling upgrade approach for the Deck's system software, a function Debian was not designed for, but which is a characteristic of Arch Linux.

An application programming interface (API) specific for the Steam Deck is available to game developers, allowing a game to specify certain settings if it is being run on a Steam Deck compared to a normal computer. Within the Steam storefront, developers can populate a special file depot for their game with lower-resolution textures and other reduced elements to allow their game to perform better on the Steam Deck; Steam automatically detects and downloads the appropriate files for the system (whether on a computer or Steam Deck) when the user installs the game.

=== Interface ===
The library page for the Steam client used on the Steam Deck. The additional icons in the bottom right of the top left game image indicate the game is Steam Deck verified.

The Steam client on the Deck features a revised interface and functions differently from the desktop client. Unlike Steam's Big Picture mode which was designed for use on television screens, which was treated as a separate software branch within Valve, the Deck version of the Steam client stays consistent with the desktop version, adding functions and interface elements to make navigating through Steam easier with controller input, and indicators typical for portable systems such as battery life and wireless connectivity. Valve replaced the previous Big Picture mode in Steam with one based on the Steam Deck user interface in February 2023. The version of Steam on the Deck otherwise supports all other functions of Steam, including user profiles and friends lists, access to game communities, cloud saving, Steam Workshop support, and the Remote Play feature.

Remote Play allows the Steam Deck to be used as a controller for a game running on a computer, providing additional control options beyond traditional keyboard and mouse or common controller systems. The Steam software on the Deck also supports suspending a game in progress, a feature considered by Valve to be core to the Deck. Otherwise, games that do not take advantage of the Steam Deck API have the handheld's controller input automatically converted for them. For example, the touch-sensitive controllers on the Deck translate input appropriately for games that typically rely on keyboard and mouse controls. Valve added to Steam's current approach to cloud saving with the introduction of Dynamic Cloud Sync in January 2022. Prior cloud functionality only synchronized game saves after the user has exited a game; developers can enable Dynamic Cloud Sync to use cloud saving while the game is running, making this feature more amenable for portable use on the Steam Deck.

=== Games ===
The Deck displays compatible games from the Steam storefront. Games developed for Linux run natively, however, the SteamOS software also includes support for Proton, a compatibility layer that allows games developed for Windows to be played on the Linux-based SteamOS. According to ProtonDB, a community-run database that compiles information on game compatibility of Steam games within Linux using Proton, several of Steam's more popular game releases were not yet compatible with Proton primarily due to anti-circumvention and anti-cheat controls or digital rights management (DRM). Valve stated they were working with vendors of these middleware solutions to improve Proton support while also encouraging Linux-specific versions to be developed. Epic Games' Easy Anti-Cheat, one of the more popular anti-cheat options for developers, was made available for macOS and Linux systems in September 2021, which Epic stated that developers could easily transition for the Proton layer. Valve worked with Epic over the end of 2021 to make the transition of Easy Anti-Cheat to Proton simple for developers. Another popular anti-cheat solution, BattlEye, also affirmed their software was ready to work with the Proton layer and only required developers to opt-in to enable it. Valve stated that in testing games otherwise currently available on Linux or compatible with the Proton layer, they had yet to find a game that failed to meet a minimum 30 frames-per-second performance on the handheld, a performance metric comparable to the consoles of the eighth generation. The Proton layer includes support for AMD's upscaling technology FidelityFX Super Resolution (FSR); while Proton also supports Nvidia's DLSS upscaling solution, it is not compatible with the Deck.

Due to potential confusion on game compatibility, Valve introduced a process in October 2021 by which they brought in additional staff to review games on Steam to make sure a game is fully playable on the Steam Deck. Games that are confirmed to be compatible with the Steam Deck, including those with Proton and any middleware DRM solutions, that by default meet minimum performance specifications, are marked as "Verified". Games that may require some user tinkering with settings, such as having to use a system control to bring up the on-screen keyboard, are tagged as "Playable". Another category, "Unsupported", are games that Valve has tested to not be fully compatible with the Steam Deck, such as VR games, or games using Windows-specific codecs that have not yet been made compatible with Proton or software apps. These ratings are to change over time as both the Steam Deck software improves as well as updates made by developers to games to improve compatibility with the Steam Deck software. By 2025, several other portable gaming computers had been released, with Valve preparing SteamOS to be used as the operating system for these devices. As part of a May 2025 update, Valve included a subset of the Steam Deck compatibility system to aid users on these alternate devices to help with identifying compatible games.

Users download games onto the Steam Deck to store on either the internal storage or SD card, each storage device treated as a separate Steam Library for games. This allows SD cards with different Steam Libraries to be swapped in and out. Valve is exploring the ability to pre-load games on an SD card outside of the Deck, such as through a personal computer. The ability to download games onto the Steam Deck from a local network Steam installation was added in February 2023. While the Deck was designed for playing games on the Steam storefront, desktop mode allows for installation of third-party storefronts like Battle.net, Epic Games Store, GOG, Ubisoft Connect, or Origin. It is possible to replace SteamOS with a different operating system entirely or set up multi-booting. It is also possible to use Microsoft Edge for Xbox Cloud Gaming, allowing those with Xbox Game Pass subscriptions access to that catalogue of games. Newell stated that Valve would support Microsoft in bringing Xbox Game Pass to Steam and Steam Deck if they want that route. With the system's open nature, users have also been able to add emulators to run games that users own from other consoles or computer systems.

=== Desktop interface and third-party utilities ===
The Deck's operating system can also be launched into desktop mode, which uses the KDE Plasma desktop environment with an immutable file system. A range of third-party software tools have been developed to bring additional utility to the device, typically installed through the desktop mode on the deck. Examples include SteamOS plugin loader Decky, emulation manager EmuDeck and the batocera.linux distribution.

The Steam Deck was used as a remote control for animatronics at Walt Disney World. It was also used for remote-operated gun turrets by Ukrainian forces defending positions during the Russian invasion of Ukraine.

== Release ==
Pre-orders for the Steam Deck were opened a day after its announcement. Pre-orders were limited to those with Steam accounts opened before June 2021, to prevent resellers from depleting stock and making the device more difficult to purchase. First-day pre-order reservations through the Steam storefront briefly crashed the servers due to the demand. By September 2021, development kits for the Steam Deck were shipping to developers. For the planned release in Asian regions, Valve worked with KOMODO to help with local production, localization, and distribution support.

The Steam Deck was released on February 25, 2022, in North America and the European regions. In Europe, it retailed from €419 onwards, between £349–569 in the United Kingdom, from 4,300 kr in Denmark and between 3,987–4,219 zł in Poland. As part of the Steam Deck's launch, Valve released Aperture Desk Job, a spinoff game in the Portal series, for free on March 1, 2022, available to all Windows and Linux/SteamOS users. The game is a de facto technology demonstration designed to show off the features of the Steam Deck, though it is still playable with an external controller. To assist in developing and testing software for the Steam Deck, Valve released SteamOS Devkit Client and Server under open-source licenses. Drivers for Windows are provided by Valve and AMD, but Valve does not provide support for them. During the first few days of release, Newell himself directly delivered some of the first Steam Deck units to residents in the Seattle area.

Due to its popularity, some pre-order purchasers were informed that later shipments of the 64 GB model and 256 GB NVMe models would be in Q2 2022 and the 512 GB NVMe model by Q3 2022. Valve informed pre-purchasers in November 2021 that due to the ongoing global chip shortage, the device would fail to ship by December and instead would ship in February 2022, retaining the same order for delivery based on pre-order placement.

By June 2022, Valve stated they were able to double the number of Steam Decks shipping out each week, helping to meet the initial reservations, and by August 2022, Valve's production was outpacing expectations, allowing them to send out Steam Decks to consumers that were originally anticipated to ship in the final quarter of the year. Valve was able to fulfil all reservations by October 2022, opening the Steam Deck to purchase without reservation, though Valve tentatively will return to a reservation system should demand be too high. In December 2022, the Steam Deck was officially released for sale in Asia. In October 2024, Valve announced that after 2 years since its release the Steam Deck will be made officially available to the Australian market from November. It was released on November 19 retailing for between A$649–1,049.

== Reception ==
=== Critical reception ===
The initial reaction to the announcement of the Steam Deck was positive. Epic Games' Tim Sweeney and Xbox Game Studios' Phil Spencer complimented Valve on the Steam Deck, with Sweeney calling it an "amazing move by Valve!" Spencer congratulated Valve "on getting so many of us excited to be able to take our games with us wherever we decide to play".

Many outlets compared the unit to that of the Nintendo Switch, generally recognized as the first true hybrid video game console. Valve stated that they did not really consider the Switch in designing the Deck, as they "tried to make all the decisions really in Steam Deck that targeted that audience and that served the customers that were already having a good time interacting with the games that are on that platform, on our platform", and that by happenstance, came out with a device that was similar in function to the Switch. The Verge stated that the Steam Deck was generally a more powerful machine compared to the Switch but that power came with a tradeoff in battery life which was greater with the Switch. Furthermore, The Verge recognized that the specifications of the Deck were more comparable to the power of the consoles of the eighth generation like the Xbox One and PlayStation 4, though using more recent compute/micro- and graphics architectures than that which powered those older systems. Kotaku stated that while the Deck and Switch may be similar in concept, the two were not competing devices due to their target demographics, with the Switch aimed more at a broad audience machine, while the Deck was geared towards more "hardcore" gamers. Digital Foundry noted that while the Deck's hardware may be more powerful, game developers only developing games for the Windows operating system are not necessarily able to get low-level access to the CPU/GPU as developers working on the Switch due to the Proton compatibility layer.

One of the main criticisms of the Steam Deck highlighted by multiple reviewers has been its battery life. Matt Hanson writing for TechRadar stated, "the battery life of the Steam Deck is pretty poor, with it just about managing one and a half hours while playing God of War ... That's going to upset a lot of people who may have been planning on using the Steam Deck for long flights, for example" and that "it certainly makes this portable gaming system feel less ... well, portable." Matt Miller of Game Informer called the device's battery life "punishingly low". Steve Hogarty wrote in The Independent that "The battery life is by far the Steam Deck's biggest weakness. The handheld PC chugs through juice like it's going out of fashion, with some graphically demanding games draining a full charge in as little as two hours of playtime." Seth G. Macy wrote for IGN in very similar terms, saying, "The biggest, most deflating issue I've had has been battery life. It's all over the place and probably the biggest reality check when it comes to realizing the dream of truly untethered PC gaming." Richard Leadbetter of Eurogamer said he "can't help [but] feel that elements like fan noise and battery life can only be resolved with a revised processor on a more efficient process node."

=== Sales ===
The research firm Omdia reported that the Steam Deck sold 1.62 million units in 2022. Their report estimated that the Steam Deck would pass 3 million units sold since its launch sometime during 2023. Through 2022 and most of 2023, the Deck had been one of the most popular purchases on the Steam storefront. Valve stated in November 2023 that they had sold "multiple millions" of the Steam Deck. Market research firm International Data Corporation estimated that between 3.7 and 4 million Steam Decks had been sold by the third anniversary of the device in February 2025.

== Legacy ==
The Steam Deck is credited with triggering a wave of similar handheld gaming computers. This includes the Asus ROG Ally and Lenovo Legion Go, which both launched in 2023, and the MSI Claw A1M which launched in 2024. The ROG Xbox Ally, a collaboration between Asus and Microsoft based on Windows with support for Xbox Game Pass and storefronts like Steam, was announced in June 2025, drawing similar comparisons to the Steam Deck.

The Steam Deck has also influenced game development for personal computers. As to assure their games are marked as Steam Deck Verified, developers have optimized their game to work at the CPU and GPU processing power that the Deck provides as to support 60 fps at 1080p with support for frame generation, rather than aiming for higher resolutions and framerates, and generally allowing the game to work across a wider range of personal computers.

== See also ==
- Ayaneo, a competing brand of handheld gaming PCs
- GPD Win, an earlier similar device
- Ultra-mobile PC
