= Ace of Spades (video game) =

2012 video game

- Developer: Jagex
- Publisher: Jagex
- Platforms: Microsoft Windows, OS X
- Release: Microsoft Windows; 12 December 2012; OS X; 16 May 2013
- Genres: First-person shooter, sandbox
- Mode: Multiplayer

Ace of Spades was a 2012 first-person shooter and voxel-based sandbox video game developed and published by Jagex. Originally created by Ben Aksoy and released as a prototype in April 2011, the game was acquired by Jagex in 2012 and fully released in December that year. Following poor reception and several minor downloadable content package releases, the game was shut down in March 2019.

== Development ==
=== Ben Aksoy prototype ===
Ace of Spades was originally developed by Ben Aksoy. The first of version of the game, Beta 0.1, was released on 4 April 2011, and was available for Microsoft Windows. This version of the game played as a 16-versus-16 team-based first-person shooter with a capture the flag game mode, in which players were to obtain the opposing team's intelligence briefcase and return it to the own team's base. Due its use of voxel-based graphics and emphasis on block-building techniques aside from gunplay, it was quickly labelled as "Minecraft with rifles". The gunplay itself was compared to that of Red Orchestra: Ostfront 41-45. Ace of Spades was received well, despite its early and unfinished state, and was listed amongst Kotaku's "Best Indie Games of 2011" list and PC Gamer's April 2011 "Best Free PC Games" list. As of November 2012, the beta of Ace of Spades had been installed 2.5 million times and had roughly 550,000 monthly active users.

=== Jagex version ===
Around 2012, Ace of Spades was acquired by British developer Jagex, which had previously started creating a new version of the game in mid-2011. Aksoy was reported to have agreed to the deal due to his critical financial state at the time, though was subsequently offered a position in Jagex' Cambridge headquarters. He continued working on the game from Jagex' offices until late 2012, when his laptop was physically damaged by one of the company's system administrators. According to a former developer for Ace of Spades, who held a Reddit AMA on the topic, Jagex provided work-for-hire developer Blitz Games with Aksoy's code in November 2012, asking for it to be rewritten within eight weeks to meet the Christmas 2012 deadline. Jagex themselves stated that they had worked with "a handful of indie developers" to have the game finished in time. The remade Ace of Spades was announced by Jagex on 1 November 2012, with a tentative release date set for the following month. The game was to be released for Microsoft Windows via the Steam digital distribution platform. On 5 December 2012, the release date was formalised to 12 December. Pre-registrations for the game were launched alongside, and by 11 December, one day before the release, Jagex reported that 500,000 users had pre-registered for the game. Ace of Spades' launch trailer, released alongside the game itself, highlighted the characteristics of the game's new characters. In reference to the game's title, the trailer also featured Motörhead's eponymous 1980 song, "Ace of Spades". Unlike previous games released by Jagex, such as RuneScape, Ace of Spades was not released in a free-to-play model and was instead provided as a one-off purchase costing US$9.99, described as a "small one-off fee". Mark Gerhard, chief executive officer of Jagex at the time, explained that this was "what's right for the game".

Shortly following the release, on 21 December, Ace of Spades was updated with free downloadable content (DLC) containing four new maps, a new weapon and the reintroduction of the capture the flag game mode. On 24 January 2013, Jagex released, alongside other new content, the "Classic Mode" that aimed to play similarly to the 2011 prototype of the game. On Valentine's Day on 14 February 2013, the game received its first paid DLC package, named St. Valentine's Day Massacre, which introduced a new "VIP mode" wherein teams defended one randomly chosen player of their own team while trying to defeat that of the other team's. A port of Ace of Spades to OS X was released on 16 May 2013. As means of promotion, the game received a "free weekend", through which people could play the full game for a limited time, and overall offered at half-price. On 2 October 2013, the game received a native map editor which could be used to produce maps shared through the Steam Workshop. Alongside this update, the previously paid St. Valentine's Day Massacre DLC was made available for free. Following onto the map editor integration, the game was updated with a custom, 24-player mode wherein players could build maps within a limited time. To reflect the new mode, the game was rebranded as Ace of Spades: Battle Builder. A second paid DLC package, Hurt + Heal, was released on 8 December 2015 and introduced two new character classes, as well as one new weapon for each of the four previous classes.

=== Closure ===
On 3 April 2018, Jagex announced that Ace of Spades would be discontinued. The game was taken off sale immediately, while dedicated game servers were to stay online through 3 July. However, on 2 July, Jagex stated that Ace of Spades' shutdown would be postponed as they considered alternative futures for the game. Considering an open-source release, the company reviewed the game's codebase, but finally decided to retire the game. Jagex clarified on 1 March 2019 that an open-source release would pose "potential technical, legal and licensing implications", and that the game's servers would be shut down on 6 March.

== Reception ==
Reception

Aggregate score
Aggregator	Score
Metacritic	49/100

Review scores
Publication	Score
Destructoid	5/10
IGN	5.9/10
PC Gamer (US)	45/100

The Jagex release of Ace of Spades received "generally unfavorable" reviews, according to review aggregator website Metacritic.

== Successor ==
On 20 November 2014, Jagex announced Block N Load as a free-to-play successor to Ace of Spades. Block N Load's developed stemmed from Alex Horton, chief creative officer at Jagex at the time, who acknowledged that Ace of Spades was not "launched well", because of which he asked Jagex' board to create a new title in the same genre.
