= Battle Aces =

2021 defunct real-time strategy video game

- Developer: Uncapped Games
- Publisher: Uncapped Games
- Platform: Windows
- Release: Canceled
- Genre: Real-time strategy
- Mode: Multiplayer

Battle Aces was a real-time strategy game developed and published by American video game studio Uncapped Games. The game was first announced during Summer Game Fest 2024 and went through a number of closed beta versions. In May 2025, Uncapped Games announced that development on the game had ceased.

== Gameplay ==
Battle Aces was a deck-building real-time strategy video game. The player took the role of a mercenary commander in charge of combat drones. Battle Aces featured streamlined base building, with the player's base being reduced to a single structure that produced all available units and also served as a drop-off point for resources collected by worker units. During a game, players could also build additional bases. Units were created instantly. Prior to a match, players could chose eight of the game's approximately 50 units. The game was designed to have short, fast-paced matches limited to ten minutes, both against another human player or together with one against an AI. A 2v2 mode was planned as well.

== Development ==
Uncapped Games was formed in June 2021 by LightSpeed and Quantum Studios Group, a subsidiary of Tencent Games. The studio, based in Playa Vista, was to be led by David Kim and Jason Hughes, both of whom had previously worked for Blizzard Entertainment, and tasked with developing a new real-time strategy video game.

At Summer Game Fest 2024, Uncapped Games announced that the title of their new game would be Battle Aces. Battle Aces was intended to be a free-to-play title. Uncapped Games intended to support the game with post-launch content and updates, with players being able to purchase additional units and cosmetics. The first closed beta test for Battle Aces began in June 2024, with further rounds of closed testing following in November of the same year as well as April 2025.

In May 2025, Uncapped Games announced that development on Battle Aces had ceased, citing the game's performance during its testing phase.

== Reception ==
Battle Aces was positively received during its beta tests. Critics praised its short matches and streamlined approach to the real-time strategy genre.
