= Asus ROG Ally =

Handheld gaming computer by Asus

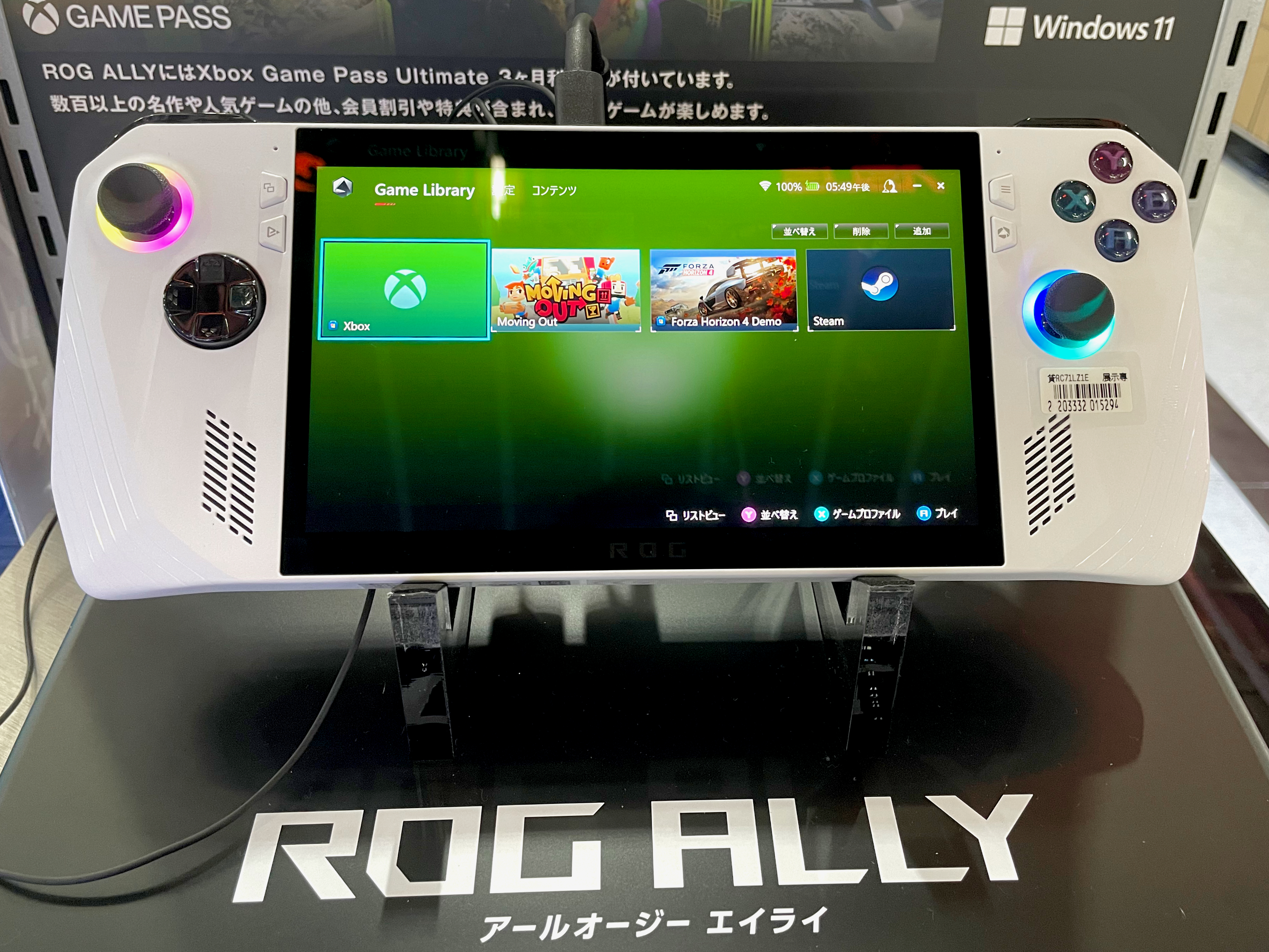
- An Asus ROG Ally running Windows 11
- Developer: Asus
- Manufacturer: Asus
- Product family: Republic of Gamers
- Type: Handheld game console
- Released: WW: June 13, 2023; (ROG Ally with Z1 Extreme): WW: September 18, 2023; (ROG Ally with Z1): WW: July 22, 2024; (ROG Ally X)
- Introductory price: US$599.99 (Z1); US$699.99 (Z1 Extreme); US$799.99 (Ally X)
- Media: Digital distribution
- Operating system: Windows 11
- CPU: AMD Ryzen Z1 (Note: Zen 4 with 4 nm process, 6-cores/12-threads, 22 MB cache, up to 4.90 GHz boost); AMD Ryzen Z1 Extreme (Note: Zen 4 with 4 nm process, 8-cores/16-threads, 24 MB cache, up to 5.10 GHz boost)
- Memory: 16 GB LPDDR5-6400, Quad-channel 32-bit (128-bit), 102.4 GB/s (Ally); 24 GB LPDDR5X-7500, Quad-channel 32-bit (128-bit), 120.0 GB/s (Ally X)
- Storage: 512 GB NVMe M.2 2230 (Ally) 1 TB NVMe M.2 2280 (Ally X) SSD (expandable)
- Removable storage: microSD/SDHC/SDXC via UHS-II
- Display: 7-inch, 1920 × 1080 FHD Touchscreen IPS LCD @ 120 Hz, 16:9, 500 nits (SDR) with VRR FreeSync Premium & Dolby Vision
- Graphics: Z1 Models: AMD RDNA 3, 4 CUs, up to 2.5 GHz, up to 2.56 TFLOPS (Note: Only when utilizing dual-issue instructions; de facto performance ~1.28 TFLOPS); Z1 Extreme Models: AMD RDNA 3, 12 CUs, up to 2.7 GHz, up to 8.29 TFLOPS (Note: Only when utilizing dual-issue instructions; de facto performance ~4.14 TFLOPS)
- Sound: Stereo speakers with Dolby Atmos
- Input: 2 × analog sticks; 2 × shoulder buttons (LB, RB); 2 × analog triggers (LT, RT); 4 × grip buttons (M1, M2); D-pad; A/B/X/Y buttons; View/Menu buttons; Command center button; Armoury Crate button; Volume +/− buttons; Power button with fingerprint scanner
- Touchpad: Touch Screen (10-point multi-touch)
- Connectivity: Bluetooth 5.2, Wi-Fi Tri-band 2.4, 5 & 6 Ghz 6E, 1× USB-C port with USB 3.2 Gen 2 & DisplayPort 1.4 alt-modes & Power Delivery 3.0, 1x 3.5 mm combo audio jack, 1× Proprietary ROG XG mobile interface (PCIe 4.0 ×8); (Ally models only) or 1x USB-C port with Thunderbolt 4, USB4 & DisplayPort 1.4 alt-modes & Power Delivery 3.0 & 1x USB-C port with USB 3.2 Gen 2 & DisplayPort 1.4 alt-modes & Power Delivery 3.0 (Ally X models only) (with 3rd Party eGPU support)
- Power: TYPE-C, 65 W (Ally) or 140 W GaN (Ally X) AC Adapter & Charger, Output: 20 V DC, 3.25 A, 65 W, Input: 100~240 V AC 50/60 Hz universal 40 Wh Lithium-ion battery 4S1P, 4-cell (Ally) 80 Wh Lithium-ion battery 4S1P, 4-cell (Ally X)
- Dimensions: 280 × 111 × 21.2~32.4 mm (11 × 4.4 × 0.8~1.3 in) (Ally); 280 × 111 × 24.7~36.9 mm (11 × 4.4 × 1~1.5 in) (Ally X)
- Weight: 608 grams (1.340 lb) (Ally); 678 grams (1.495 lb) (Ally X)
- Successor: ROG Xbox Ally
- Website: Official website

The Asus ROG Ally is a handheld gaming computer developed and manufactured by Asus as part of their Republic of Gamers (ROG) brand. Released on June 13, 2023, the device competes with Valve's Steam Deck. The ROG Ally runs with Microsoft's Windows 11 operating system and uses an AMD Zen 4 processor called the AMD Ryzen Z1 and Z1 Extreme. In addition to handheld use, the ROG Ally can be connected to a TV or monitor through a docking station or a dongle and be used like a desktop computer or home video game console.

== History ==
Asus began developing a handheld gaming console in 2018 to compete with handheld computers such as the GPD Win 2. Development slowed down over the next few years but was accelerated after Valve's 2021 announcement of the Steam Deck, which quickly led to a renewed public interest in handheld gaming computers. The device was announced on April 1, 2023, leading many to believe it was an April Fools' Day prank, with Asus clarifying its legitimacy three days later.

Asus revealed the ROG Ally's release date, technical specifications and price on June 11, 2023. Two models were announced, one retailing for US$599 and implementing a Ryzen Z1 Processor, and another retailing for US$699 and implementing a Ryzen Z1 Extreme processor. The latter was released on June 13, 2023, and the former was released during the third quarter of 2023.

At Computex 2024, Asus announced the ROG Ally X, a high performance update of the Z1 Extreme model. It has 1 TB of NVMe storage, an M.2 2280 slot instead of M.2 2230, 24 GB of LPDDR5X-7500 RAM, a larger battery, and other improvements, priced at US$799.

At the Xbox Games Showcase 2025, Asus and Microsoft announced the Xbox version of ROG Ally and Ally X, titled "ROG Xbox Ally" and "ROG Xbox Ally X". The first Xbox-branded handheld gaming computer, it features the controller grips inspired by Xbox Wireless Controller, dedicated Xbox button, impulse triggers (only for X model) and other Xbox-related features, and is powered by Ryzen Z2 AI Extreme and A processors. It was released on October 16, 2025.

== Hardware ==
The ROG Ally implements an AMD APU, based on AMD's Zen 4 and RDNA 3 architectures. Two different models of the ROG Ally were released, one with a Ryzen Z1 processor and another with a Ryzen Z1 Extreme. The Z1 CPU runs a six-core/twelve-thread unit and the Z1 GPU runs on four compute units with a total estimated performance of 2.56 TFLOPS. The Z1 Extreme CPU runs an eight-core/sixteen-thread unit while its GPU runs on twelve compute units at an estimate of 8.6 teraflops. Both processors use variable timing frequencies, with the Z1 running between 3.2 and 4.9 GHz and the Z1 Extreme running between 3.3 and 5.1 GHz. The main unit of the Ally is designed for handheld use. It features a 7-inch touchscreen LCD with a 1080p resolution and variable refresh rate that goes from 48Hz up to 120 Hz. Controls resemble those of an Xbox Wireless Controller, including two thumbsticks, a directional pad, A/B/X/Y buttons, two shoulder buttons on each side, and two configurable buttons on the back of the unit.

== Software ==
The ROG Ally ships with Windows 11 Home integrated with Armoury Crate SE, a software utility developed by Asus. Armoury Crate lets the user quickly configure thermal design power with several pre-adjusted presets, as well as change the refresh rate, screen resolution, limit frame rate and adjust clock rates. Armoury Crate also acts as a game launcher, automatically compiling the user's game library from third-party launchers like Steam, Epic Games Store, GOG, Ubisoft Connect and the EA App. Although Windows 11 improved touchscreen support, some interactions can only be done using a mouse cursor. Due to this, Armoury Crate lets users emulate a mouse using the left joystick. The ROG Ally also ships with a three-month subscription to Xbox Game Pass, a video game subscription service from Microsoft.

=== Alternative operating systems ===
Some users opt to replace Windows 11 with Bazzite, a Linux distribution optimized for handheld gaming devices such as the ROG Ally. It offers native support for Steam, Proton, and Flatpak-based game launchers, along with performance tweaks tailored for portable gaming PCs. One analysis found that replacing Windows 11 with SteamOS improved performance consistently across a range of titles.

== Reception ==
The initial response to the ROG Ally was mixed. Tony Polanco of Tom's Guide described it as "solid but imperfect", complimenting its display and ergonomics but criticizing performance and battery life. In contrast to Polanco's review, Sean Hollister of The Verge praised the device's performance but criticized Asus' choice of Windows 11 as an operating system, calling Windows "largely foreign" on a handheld form-factor. Writing for Eurogamer, Richard Leadbetter wrote: "Various issues conspire to lend the impression that the ROG Ally isn't fully baked quite yet, while the Windows underpinnings may well be a limiting factor that may never be overcome."

A criticism highlighted by multiple reviews is the battery life. Hollister reported a 53-minute battery life playing The Last of Us Part I on the 25W TDP profile, while Kevin Purdy of Ars Technica measured an 88-minute life playing The Witcher 3: Wild Hunt on the 15W profile. Writing for Windows Central, Rebecca Spear described battery life as "pretty atrocious", while Anyron Copeman of Tech Advisor commented that the device's fast 65W charging capability makes up for its poor battery life.

== Controversy ==
At the ROG Ally’s release, reports of microSD cards, or in some cases the reader itself, were overheating and breaking. This is due to a design flaw where the reader is postitioned just above the left side of the cooling system. Asus acknowledged the issue in July 2023 and later extended warranty by 1 year and offered to reimburse customers the retail value of the damaged cards for US customers in May 2024.

In May 2024, YouTube tech channel Gamers Nexus sent an ROG Ally in for warranty repair due to a faulty thumbstick. Asus denied the warranty repair, arguing that the thumbstick issue was due to "customer-induced damage". Furthermore, Asus demanded a repair fee of US$191.47 for replacement of the LCD panel and the top case because of a "small mark" on the casing, despite it not being related to the original issue that the device was sent in under warranty for. Asus also stated that it would send the device back to Gamers Nexus in a "disassembled state" if it did not pay the repair fee. Several days later, Asus honoured the warranty and performed the repair of the original issue under pressure from Gamers Nexus, as well as subsequently apologised for the poor service.
