= Block N Load =

2015 video game

- Developers: Jagex; Artplant
- Publisher: Jagex
- Engine: Unity
- Platform: Microsoft Windows
- Release: 30 April 2015
- Genres: First-person shooter, sandbox
- Mode: Multiplayer

Block N Load was a team-based first-person shooter and voxel-based sandbox video game developed and published by Jagex in conjunction with Artplant. A successor to Ace of Spades, the game was initially released as a paid title on 30 April 2015 before being released as a free-to-play title as part of an update on 1 October 2015.

== Reception ==
Block N Load was released on 30 April 2015 to mixed reviews, according to review aggregator platform Metacritic.

== Shutdown ==
In 2018 the IP was sold to Toadman Interactive.

On 25 July 2025, an announcement was made on Steam that the game was to be shut down on 1 August. Three days later on 28 July, Block N Load 2 (a work in progress successor) was canceled and was scheduled to be removed from Steam on the same day as the shutdown.
