= MSI Claw A8 =

2025 handheld gaming consoles by MSI

The Claw A8 BZ2EM and Claw 8 AI, are 2025 gaming handheld consoles. This device is part of the Claw series from MSI, and is designed to compete with other high-end gaming handheld consoles.

== A8 Specifications ==
The Claw A8 BZ2EM and Claw 8 AI use AMD Ryzen Z2 Extreme processors and contain 24GB of LPDDR5X-8000 memory.

The Claw A8 also includes an 8-inch FHD+ 120Hz touchscreen, with resolution capabilities of 1920 x 1200. It also supports VRR (Variable Refresh Rate).

It features AMD Radeon Graphics with 16 RDNA3.5 Compute Units. It includes a 1TB M.2 SSD and contains a 6-cell, 80Wh Li-Polymer battery.

The device uses the Operating system Windows 11 Home and comes with two Thunderbolt USB-C ports, a microSD card reader, and 2W speakers.

== Claw 8 AI+ A2VM Specifications ==
The MSI Claw 8 AI+ A2VM each contain an Intel Core Ultra 7 258V processor, 32GB LPDDR5X-8533 memory, and 1TB of PCIe NVMe SSD Gen 4x4 storage. These devices include an 8-inch 120Hz Full HD IPS-Level (1920 x 1200) 100% sRGB touch screen display.

The Claw 8 AI+ A2VM supports Windows 11 Home and comes installed with Intel Arc Graphics 140V. It also includes Killer Wi-Fi 7 BE1750 and Bluetooth 5.4.

The device also uses Hall Effect Joysticks and Triggers. It contains two Thunderbolt 4 ports for external display connection and charging, and includes space for a MicroSD card reader for additional storage.

The device weighs 795 grams (1.8 lbs) and measures 299 x 126 x 24 mm (11.8 x 5 x 0.9 inches).
