= Gaming computer =

Desktop or laptop computer specialized for video games

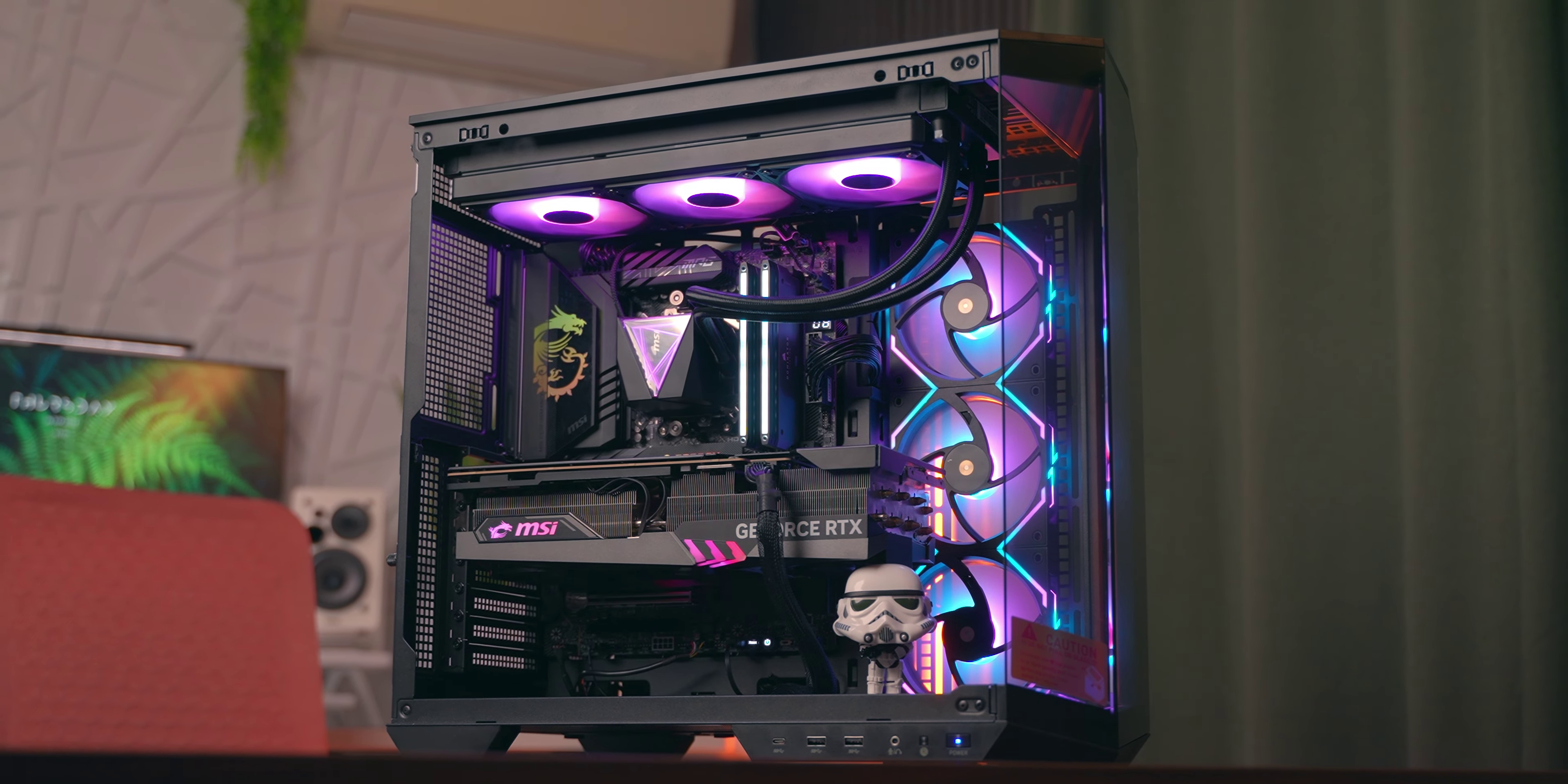
A desktop gaming PC from the 2020s. Some modern high-end graphics cards have enough leverage to require additional support to prevent GPU sag.

A laptop gaming PC from the 2020s manufactured by MSI

A gaming computer, also known as a gaming PC, is a specialized personal computer designed for playing PC games at high standards. They typically differ from mainstream personal computers by using high-performance GPUs, or graphics cards, a high core-count CPU with higher raw performance, and higher-performance RAM. Gaming PCs are also used for other demanding tasks such as video editing. While often in desktop form, gaming PCs may also be laptops or handhelds.

== History ==
=== Early history ===
The Nimrod, designed by John Makepeace Bennett, built by Raymond Stuart-Williams and exhibited in the 1951 Festival of Britain, is regarded as the first gaming computer. Bennett did not intend for it to be a real gaming computer, however, as it was supposed to be an exercise in mathematics as well as to prove computers could "carry out very complex practical problems", not purely for enjoyment.

A few years later, game consoles like the Magnavox Odyssey (released in 1972) and the Atari 2600 (released 1977) were the basis of the future of not just gaming consoles, but gaming computers as well with their increasing popularity with families everywhere. The first "modern" computer was made in 1942, the Atanasoff–Berry Computer (ABC for short). Unlike modern desktops and laptops, the ABC was a gargantuan machine that occupied "1,800 square feet… weighing almost 50 tons". When the Apple II and the Commodore 64 were released in 1977 and 1982 respectively, personal computers became more appealing for general consumer use. The Commodore 64 was an affordable and relatively powerful computer for its time in 1982, featuring an MOS Technology 6510 CPU with 64 kb of RAM. It could display up to "40 columns and 25 lines of text" along with 16 colors on its 320x200 resolution screen. The Apple II cost around US$1,298 in 1977 ($5,633 adjusted for inflation in 2021) and the Commodore 64 cost around US$595 (equivalent to $1,985 in 2025), making it expensive for most consumers. However, their overall computing power, efficiency, and compact size was more advanced from even the most advanced computers at the time.

=== Since 1990s and current market ===
IBM PC-compatibles have been the dominant types of PCs globally, both mainstream and by extension in gaming, since the 1990s. During that decade a number of special PC product lines were created by OEMs that focused on pre-built gaming desktop computers, such as Alienware, formed in 1997; and HP with their OMEN division, whose lineage dates back to 1991 under the defunct brand VoodooPC; and both of which continue to be marketed today.

From the mid-1990s as 3D gaming was taking off, companies like 3dfx (with their Voodoo) and Nvidia (with their RIVA 128) advanced the market with their new graphical processing units. Multimedia PCs in the 1990s were built with high-performance graphics cards, a defining feature of gaming computers.

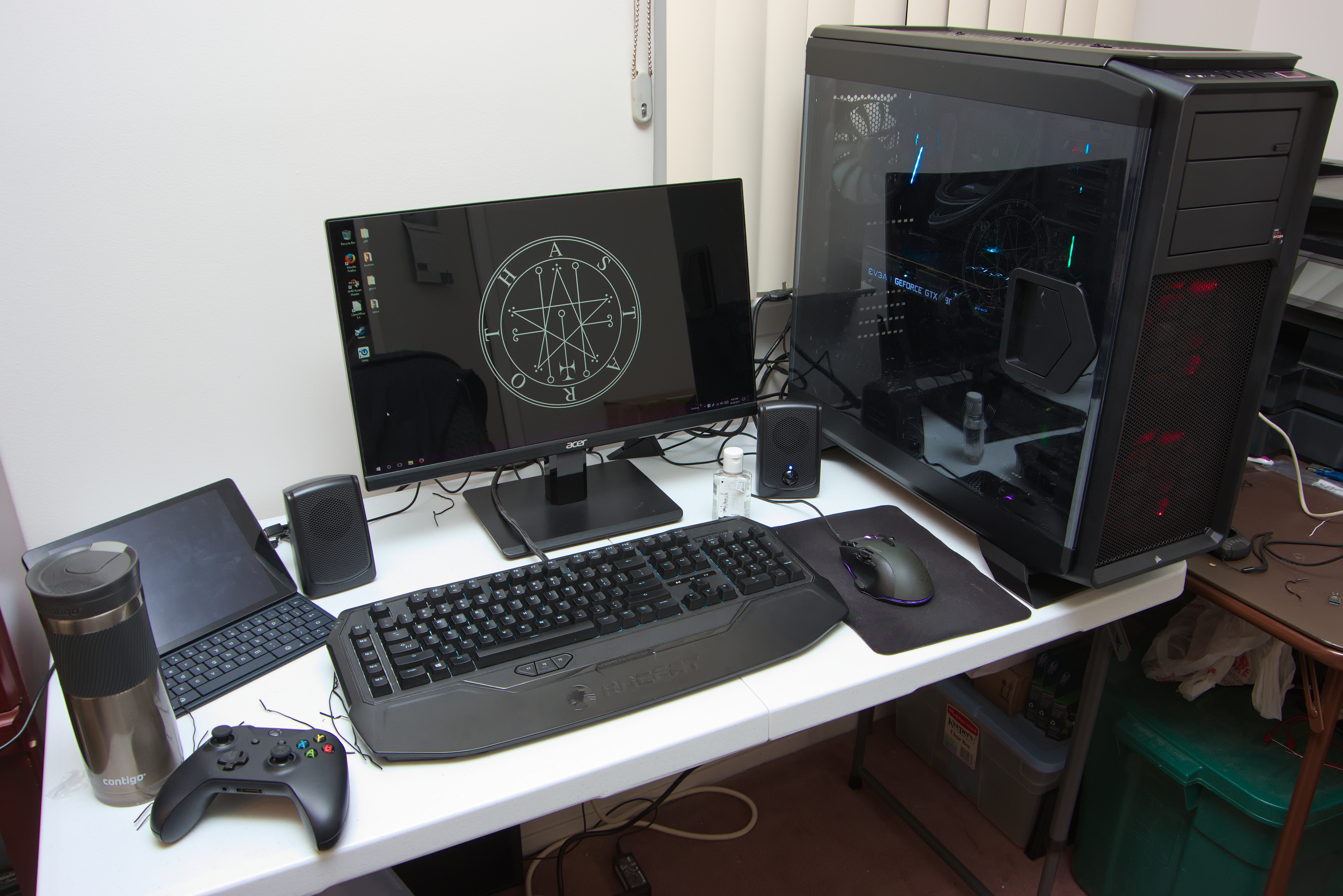
A gaming desktop setup from the 2010s

More manufacturers started making gaming PC lines (or were started for this purpose) during the 2000s and 2010s, such as Toshiba's now-defunct Qosmio; Asus's ROG (Republic of Gamers) and TUF; Acer's Predator line; Lenovo's Legion; and Razer. During this time, gaming laptops started to gain popularity. More recently in the 2020s, portable handheld gaming PCs have started to gain traction that run on full desktop x86 (the de facto standard) platforms. These began with GPD's Win and Alienware's UFO concept, inspired by the Nintendo Switch (which is not a PC), and have been popularized by Valve Corporation's Steam Deck.

65.1 million gaming products have been sold overall as of 2021, of which 27.9 million are gaming notebooks, 19.7 million are gaming monitors, and 17.5 million are gaming desktops.

== Hardware ==
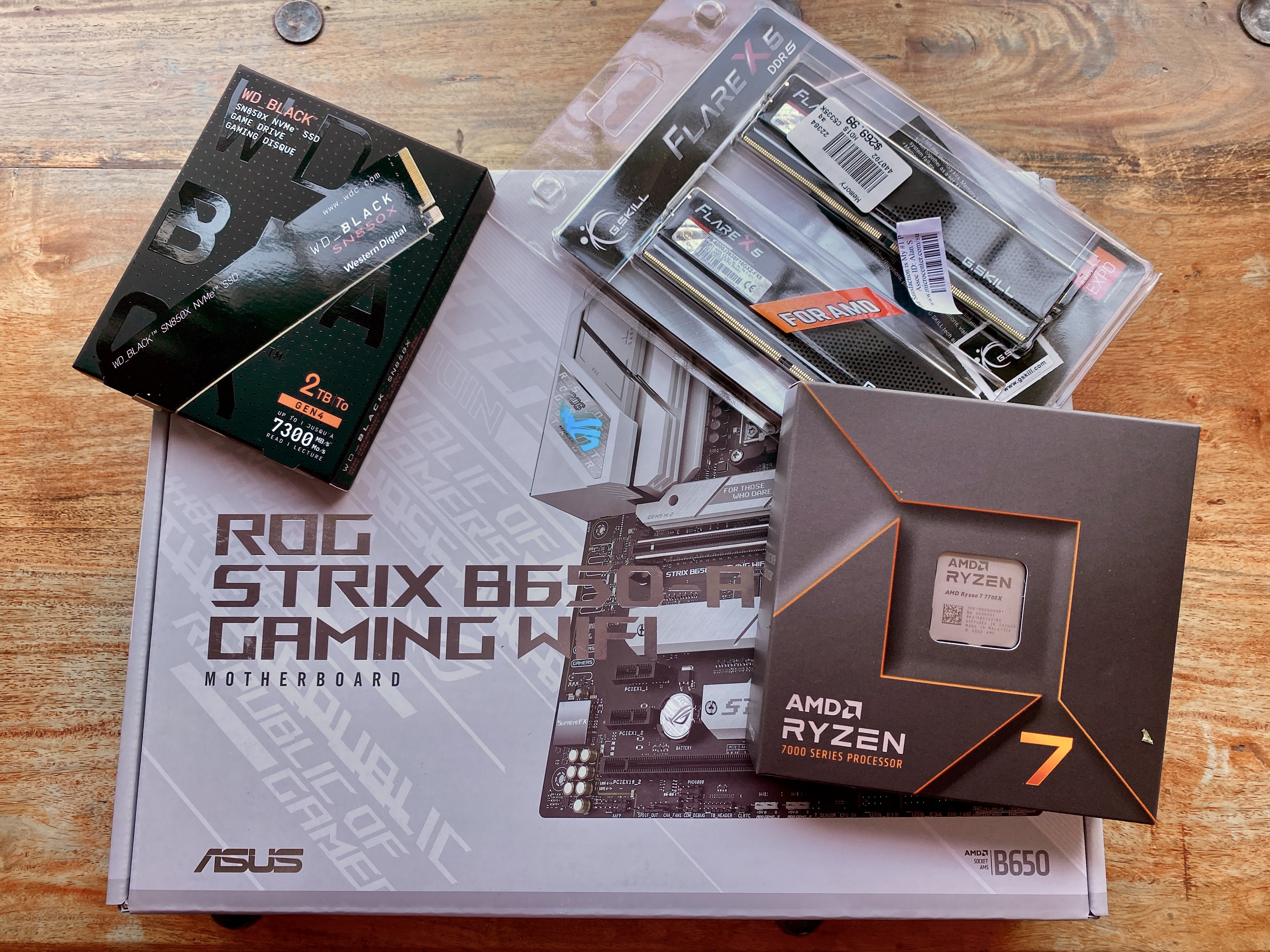
A selection of several gaming PC hardware components

Technically, any computer can be considered a "gaming computer"; however the most common ones are based around an x86-based CPU with a graphics accelerator card, a sufficient amount of high-performance RAM, and fast storage drives.

In a desktop configuration, a case is also needed, and gaming cases are often modified or manufactured with extra LED lights or see-through panels for aesthetic reasons. Individual components are typically attached to a motherboard through different bus slots, including the CPU, RAM, and graphics card, or wired to it with SATA or IDE cabling (for hard disks or optical drives). Laptops also share a similar format, but with smaller and less power hungry components.

Gamers and computer enthusiasts may choose to overclock their CPUs and GPUs in order to gain extra performance. The added power draw needed to overclock either processing unit often requires additional cooling, usually by air cooling or water cooling.

These configurations mostly dates back to the 1990s when Intel and Microsoft first began to dominate the PC marketplace, and has not changed significantly since then. Semiconductor specs continue to improve over time due to the graphical demands of games, especially with architectural and other changes within CPU and GPU designs.

== Form factors ==
Senior editor of Tom's Hardware Andrew Freedman says that "Gaming rigs aren't one-size fits all", and that there are certain instances where a gaming desktop will be more appropriate than a laptop and other circumstances where a laptop is more appropriate than a desktop. Each platform has its pros and cons, which may change depending on a person's needs. For example, someone looking for maximum portability may choose a laptop over a desktop since it is all self-contained in one unit, whereas a desktop setup is split up into multiple components: a monitor, keyboard, mouse, and the desktop itself. Freedman states that laptops are ideal candidates for LAN parties, especially ones equipped with "Nvidia's Max-Q GPUs" which "can easily fit into a backpack and don't pack outrageously large chargers".

=== Desktop ===
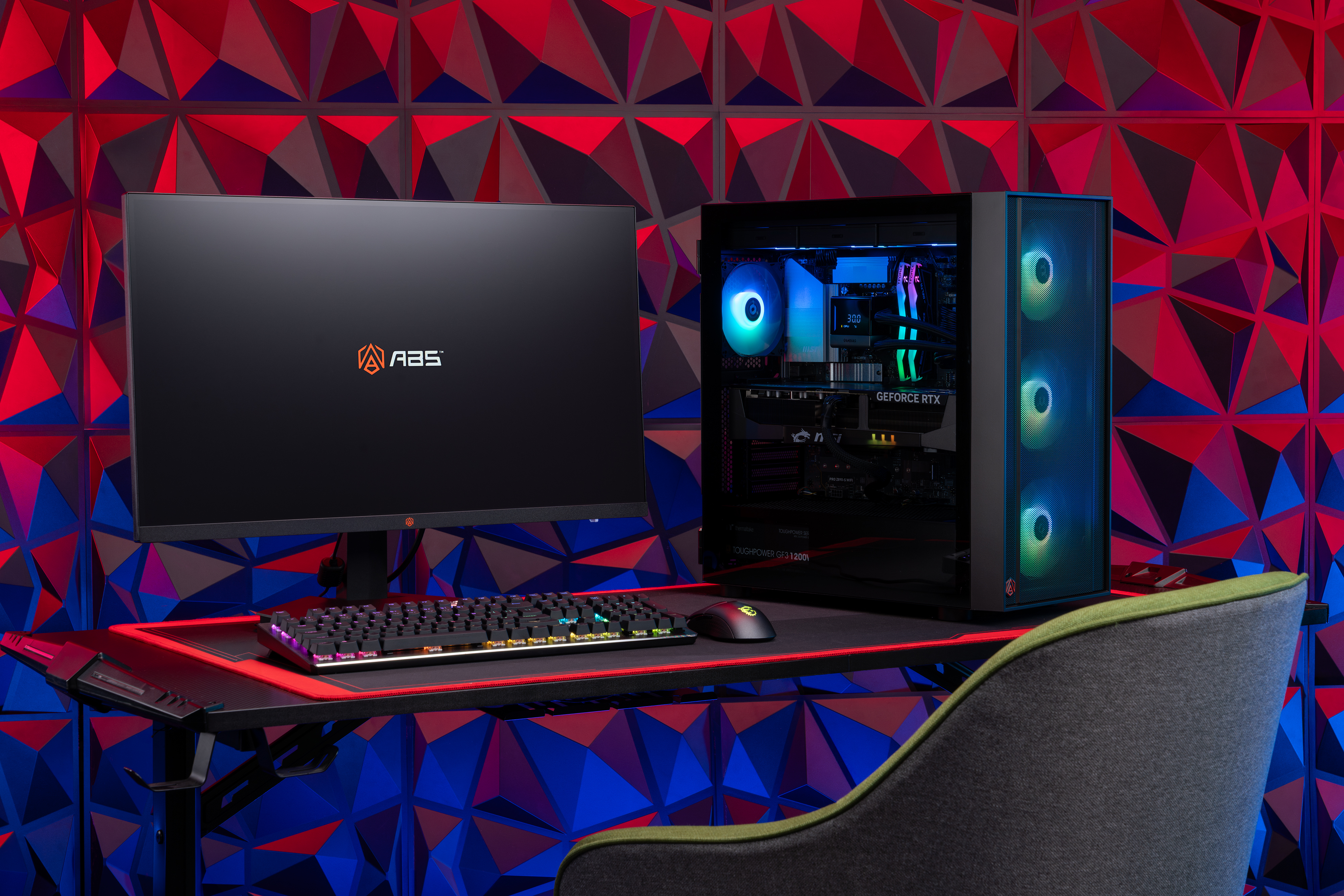
ABS PC and monitor setup from the mid 2020s

Gaming desktop computers are the most versatile types of gaming computers. People usually buy gaming PCs because they want the performance that is expected of them. The majority of this potential lies in the parts of desktops, which can be overclocked for more performance, as well as being able to withstand abuse thanks to their higher durability. The large chassis on a desktop also allows for more fans, for improved cooling and heat dissipation, which would ultimately lead to improved gaming performance.

Pre-built desktops, may use "proprietary motherboards that aren't standard sizes". These uniquely shaped motherboards can limit the owner's capability to upgrade components in the future, but they can still generally change out "the RAM, GPU and… CPU". Razer Inc.'s project Christine (2014) proposes the use of modules to allow for fast replacement of computer parts.

=== Laptops ===
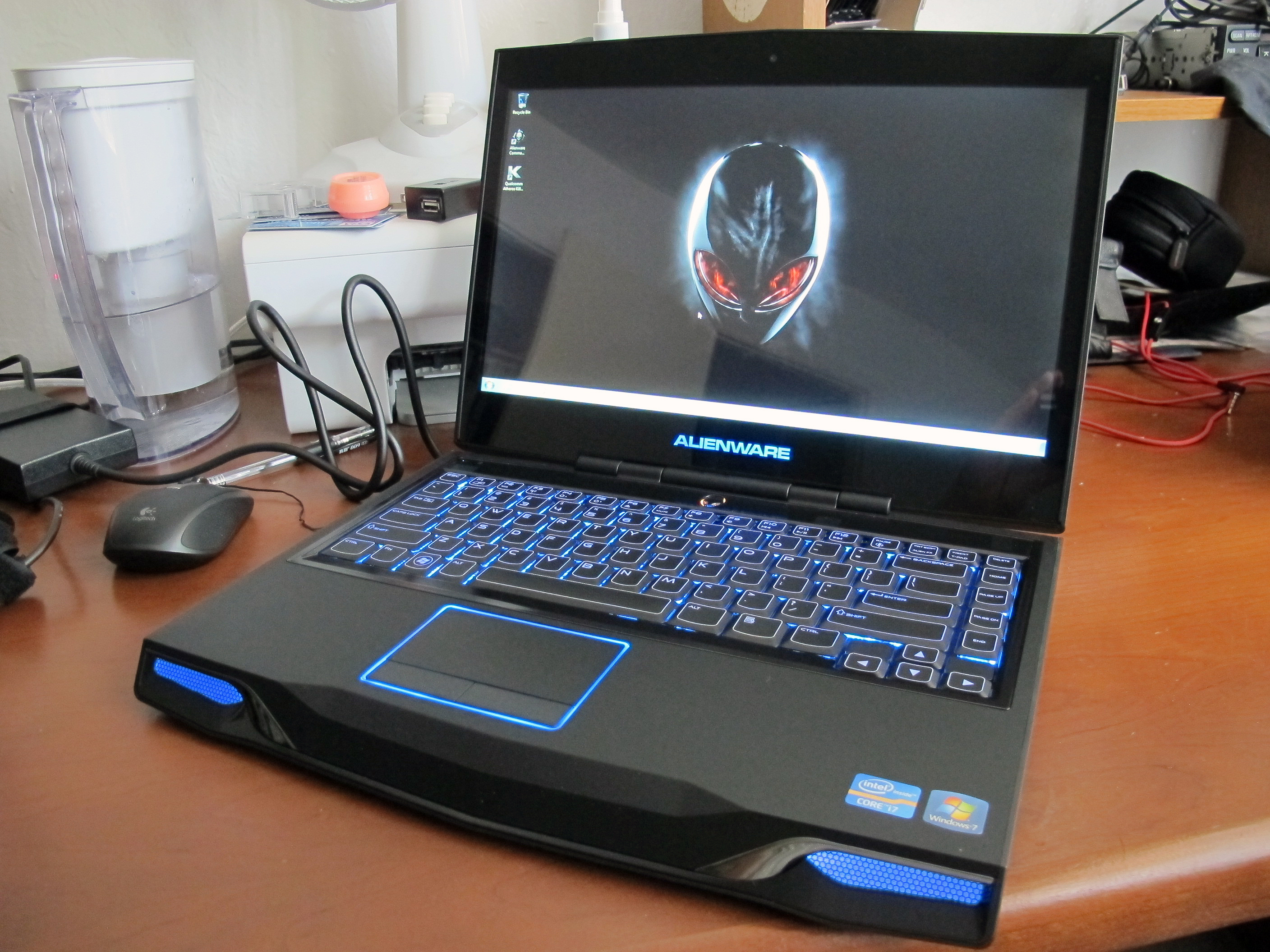
Alienware M14x, a gaming laptop from the early 2010s

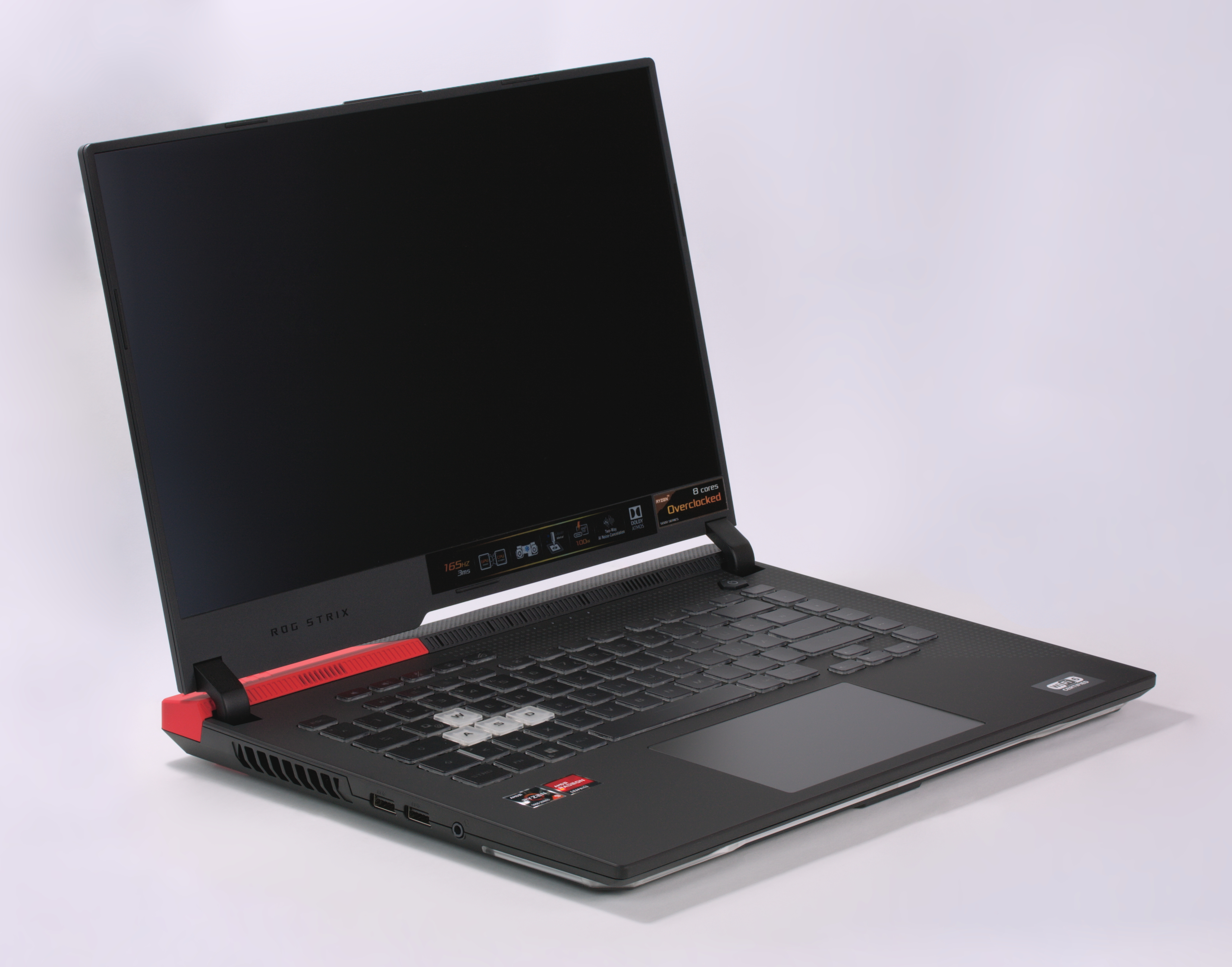
Asus ROG Strix G15, a gaming laptop from the early 2020s

Laptop gaming computers give the ability for gaming on portable computers. The usable space inside a laptop is much more limited compared to a desktop. There are also fewer items that can be changed out on a laptop than a desktop, like RAM and storage, compared to a desktop where almost all the components, including motherboards and CPUs, can be swapped out with the latest technology available at the time.

=== Handheld ===
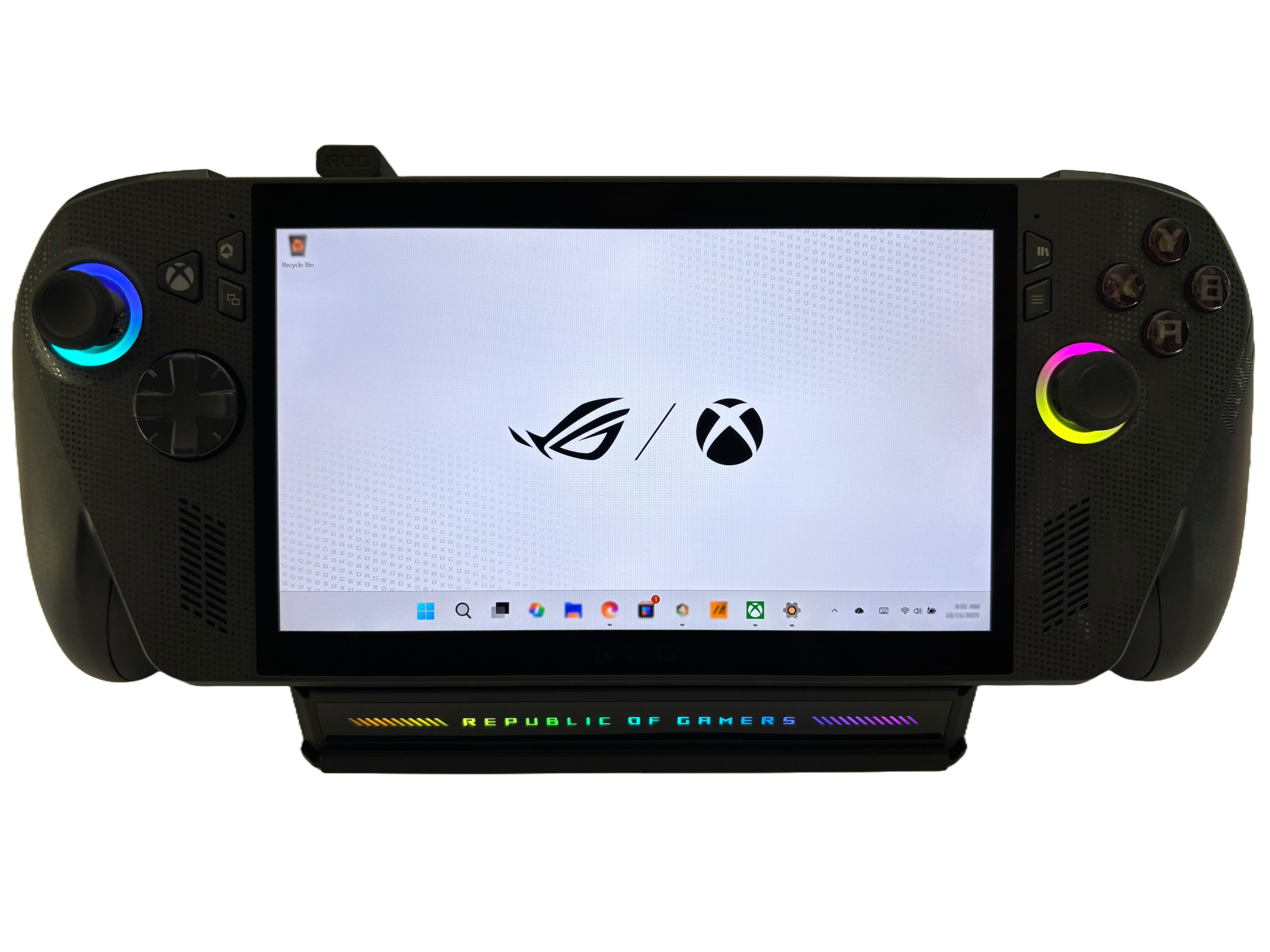
ROG Xbox Ally, a handheld gaming computer

Some gaming computers have form factors similar to handheld game consoles, usually featuring large touchscreens and integrated gamepad-styled controls (with designs often being reminiscent of the Nintendo Switch), a full-screen user interface optimized for use with controllers, and the ability to access a traditional desktop environment. These devices are usually structured as mobile devices with limited ability to upgrade components (although some components, such as storage, are user-serviceable).

The category was popularized in 2022 by Valve's Steam Deck, which features a customized Linux distribution with a default, console-like user interface, integration of a Windows compatibility layer for games not natively ported to Linux, and facilities for game developers to target the device for specific performance optimizations. By 2024, the market had grown to include a number of competing models, most of which eschewing Linux for Windows (which theoretically provided wider support for games with limited or no Linux support).

== Build types ==
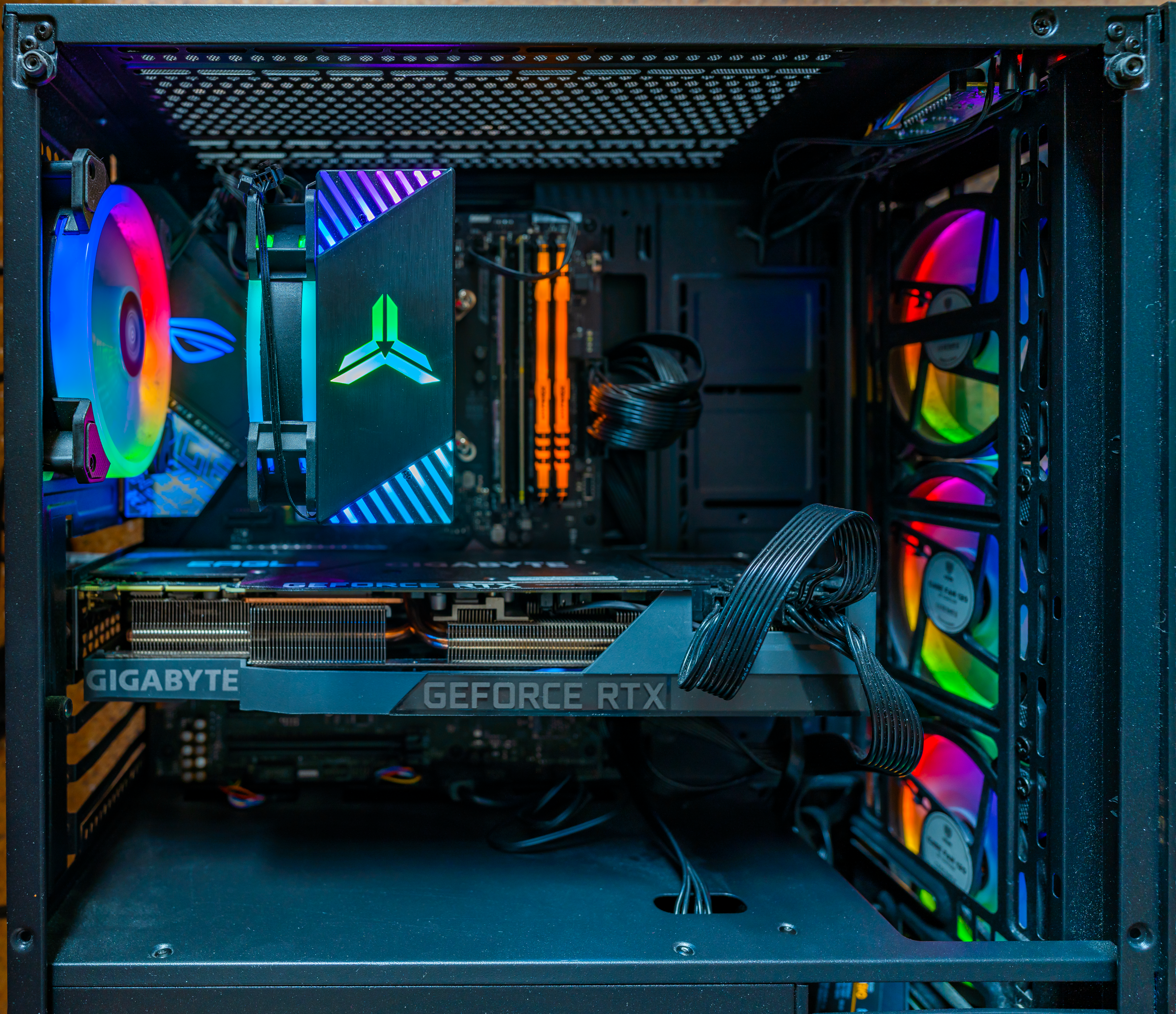
Interior of a desktop gaming PC

As stated before, there are options PC gamers take into account when deciding to build their own unit versus buying a pre-built one. There are not many options when it comes to the laptop configuration but they do exist. Jason Clarke, a contributor to Chillblast, mentioned that there are a number of builders that deal specifically with laptops, with some adding configurable features that were not originally there, such as being able to change CPUs and GPUs. These PC builders build from scratch, and the possibility to change out CPUs and GPUs after they have been installed is unlikely. Clarke also advised that people should and cannot build their own laptops because of how complex and compact everything is.

Many PC gamers and journalists, like Clarke and Freedman, advise people to start with gaming desktops as they are the way to go when seeking pure performance. Pre-built desktops like Alienware's Aurora R11 are ready-to-go systems with a history behind them, but some claim that their systems are over-priced. This is mainly due to the cost of building the PC and ease of access for components for the consumer. Marshall Honorof, a writer for Tom's Guide, explains that the steps on how to build a gaming PC from scratch "can be a daunting process, particularly for newcomers" but it could be one of the best technological decisions someone can make. According to his research, Honorof found that $1,500 is enough to buy a "powerful, but not quite top-of-the-line" computer and one can choose his or her own components.

== See also ==
- Mobile workstation
- PC game
- PC Master Race
- Workstation
