= Razer Edge =

Handheld game console

Razer Edge is a series of handheld gaming tablets developed and manufactured by Razer Inc.

== 2013 model ==
Unveiled in 2012 under the codename "Project Fiona" and released in 2013, the first-generation Razer Edge was a Windows 8-based 2-in-1 tablet with gaming-oriented features. It features a 10.1-inch touchscreen with a resolution of 1366x768, third-generation Intel Core CPUs, and discrete Nvidia GeForce GT 640M LE graphics. The Edge was released in two models, with the entry-level Edge featuring a 1.7 GHz Core i5-3317U processor, 4 GB of RAM, and 64 GB of internal storage, and the Edge Pro featuring a 1.9 GHz Core i7-3517U processor, 8 GB of RAM, and 128 or 256 GB of internal storage.

The Edge supports several accessories, including a docking station that allows 1080p output to an external display, and the "GamePad"—a case that adds gamepad controls to the sides of the tablet, and a slot for an optional secondary battery. Razer also offered an optional keyboard attachment.

== 2023 model ==
Razer Edge (2023)
- Developer: Razer Inc.
- Type: Tablet computer
- Released: January 26, 2023
- Introductory price: US$399.99
- Operating system: Android
- System on a chip: Qualcomm Snapdragon G3x Gen 1
- Memory: 8 GB LPDDR5
- Storage: 128 GB NVMe SSD
- Display: 6.8-inch, AMOLED 2400 x 1080 @ 144 Hz
- Graphics: Adreno 660, up to 1.38 TFLOPS
- Connectivity: USB-C; Bluetooth 5.2; Wi-Fi 6E
- Weight: 401 g
- Website: Official website

In October 2022 during its RazerCon event, Razer unveiled a second-generation version of the Edge; unlike the first-generation model, the second-generation Edge is positioned as an Android-based "cloud gaming" tablet with detachable controls similar to the Razer Kishi accessory, a 6.8-inch 144 Hz display with a 2400x1080 resolution, and a Qualcomm Snapdragon G3x Gen 1 system-on-chip, and versions with either Wi-Fi or 5G cellular connectivity. The device is bundled with apps for cloud gaming and remote play services, as well as game marketplaces such as Epic Games Store, Steam and Battle.net.
