= 2022 in video games =

2022 saw the lingering effects of the COVID-19 pandemic on the video game industry, slowing hardware sales for most of the year as well as development delays for major titles. The industry continued its trend of acquisitions and mergers, highlighted by Microsoft announcing its plan to acquire Activision Blizzard for nearly $69 billion. The industry as a whole continued to deal with issues such as workplace harassment and discrimination, alongside crunch periods, leading to at least the quality assurance staff at three separate studios to vote to unionize. This year also began a wave of mass layoffs.

Production of the ninth-generation consoles, the PlayStation 5 and Xbox Series X/S, remained constrained for the first part of the year, but eased up later in the year. New hardware trends included the widespread availability of graphics cards with real-time ray tracing, and the release of the Steam Deck by Valve, a handheld personal computing device capable of playing most games available on Steam. The gaming community remained cautious on the metaverse and blockchain games, though leading publishers expressed their desires to move more into that space.

== Financial performance ==
According to market research firm Newton, the global video game industry had total revenues of $184.4 billion, about a 4% decline year-to-year. Half of that was from mobile games, while console games, computer games, and browser games made up 28%, 21%, and 1% of the market, respectively.

=== Best-selling premium games by region ===
The following titles were 2022's top ten best-selling premium games by region (excluding microtransactions and free-to-play titles) on PC and console platforms, for Japan, the United States, and Europe.

| Rank | Japan | United States | Europe |
|---|---|---|---|
| 1 | Pokémon Scarlet and Violet | Call of Duty: Modern Warfare II | FIFA 23 |
| 2 | Splatoon 3 | Elden Ring | Call of Duty: Modern Warfare II |
| 3 | Pokémon Legends: Arceus | Madden NFL 23 | Elden Ring |
| 4 | Kirby and the Forgotten Land | God of War Ragnarök | Grand Theft Auto V |
| 5 | Nintendo Switch Sports | Lego Star Wars: The Skywalker Saga | FIFA 22 |
| 6 | Mario Kart 8 Deluxe | Pokémon Scarlet and Violet (Note: Not including digital sales) | Pokémon Legends: Arceus |
| 7 | Minecraft | FIFA 23 | God of War Ragnarök |
| 8 | Mario Party Superstars | Pokémon Legends: Arceus | Lego Star Wars: The Skywalker Saga |
| 9 | Super Smash Bros. Ultimate | Horizon Forbidden West | Horizon Forbidden West |
| 10 | Elden Ring | MLB The Show 22 (Note: Not including Xbox or Switch digital sales) | Gran Turismo 7 |

== Top-rated games ==
=== Critically acclaimed games ===
Metacritic is an aggregator of video game journalism reviews. It generally considers expansions and re-releases as separate entities.

Releases scoring 90/100 or higher on Metacritic in 2022
| Title | Developer(s) | Publisher(s) | Release | Platform(s) | Average score |
|---|---|---|---|---|---|
| Elden Ring | FromSoftware | Bandai Namco Entertainment | February 25, 2022 | PS5, XSX/S | 96 |
| Portal Companion Collection | Valve, Nvidia Lightspeed Studios | Valve | June 28, 2022 | NS | 95 |
| Persona 5 Royal | Atlus | Sega | October 21, 2022 | WIN | 95 |
| The Witcher 3: Wild Hunt - Complete Edition | CD Projekt Red | CD Projekt | December 14, 2022 | PS5 | 94 |
| Persona 5 Royal | Atlus | Sega | October 21, 2022 | NS, XSX/S | 94 |
| Elden Ring | FromSoftware | Bandai Namco Entertainment | February 25, 2022 | WIN | 94 |
| God of War Ragnarök | Santa Monica Studio | Sony Interactive Entertainment | November 9, 2022 | PS5 | 94 |
| Dwarf Fortress | Bay 12 Games | Kitfox Games | December 6, 2022 | WIN | 93 |
| The Stanley Parable: Ultra Deluxe | Crows Crows Crows | | April 27, 2022 | XSX/S | 93 |
| God of War | Jetpack Interactive | Sony Interactive Entertainment | January 14, 2022 | WIN | 93 |
| Cuphead in the Delicious Last Course | Studio MDHR | | June 30, 2022 | XBO | 92 |
| Chained Echoes | Matthias Linda | Deck13 | December 8, 2022 | WIN | 91 |
| Persona 5 Royal | Atlus | Sega | October 21, 2022 | PS5 | 91 |
| Chained Echoes | Matthias Linda | Deck13 | December 8, 2022 | NS | 90 |
| Rogue Legacy 2 | Cellar Door Games | | April 28, 2022 | XSX/S | 90 |
| The Stanley Parable: Ultra Deluxe | Crows Crows Crows | | April 27, 2022 | WIN | 90 |
| The Legend of Heroes: Trails from Zero | Nihon Falcom | NIS America | September 27, 2022 | WIN | 90 |

=== Major awards ===
| Category/Organization | | 40th Golden Joystick Awards November 22, 2022 | The Game Awards 2022 December 8, 2022 | 26th Annual D.I.C.E. Awards February 23, 2023 | 23rd Game Developers Choice Awards March 22, 2023 | | 19th British Academy Games Awards March 30, 2023 |
|---|---|---|---|---|---|---|---|
| Game of the Year | | Elden Ring | | | | | Vampire Survivors |
| Independent / Debut (Note: Some award presentations combine these categories.) | Indie | Cult of the Lamb | Stray | Tunic | Stray | | Tunic |
| Independent / Debut | Debut | Cult of the Lamb | Stray | Tunic | Stray | | Tunic |
| Mobile | | —N/a | Marvel Snap | | —N/a | | |
| VR / AR | | —N/a | Moss: Book II | Red Matter 2 | —N/a | | |
| Artistic Achievement | Animation | Elden Ring | | God of War Ragnarök | Elden Ring | | God of War Ragnarök |
| Artistic Achievement | Art Direction | Elden Ring | | God of War Ragnarök | Elden Ring | | Tunic |
| Audio | Music | Metal: Hellsinger | God of War Ragnarök | | God of War Ragnarök | | God of War Ragnarök |
| Audio | Sound Design | Metal: Hellsinger | God of War Ragnarök | | God of War Ragnarök | | God of War Ragnarök |
| Character or Performance | Leading Role | Manon Gage as Marissa Marcel; Immortality | Christopher Judge as Kratos; God of War Ragnarök | Kratos; God of War Ragnarök | —N/a | | Christopher Judge as Kratos; God of War Ragnarök |
| Character or Performance | Supporting Role | Manon Gage as Marissa Marcel; Immortality | Christopher Judge as Kratos; God of War Ragnarök | Kratos; God of War Ragnarök | —N/a | | Laya Deleon Hayes as Angrboda; God of War Ragnarök |
| Game Direction or Design | Game Design | —N/a | Elden Ring | Elden Ring | Elden Ring | | Vampire Survivors |
| Game Direction or Design | Game Direction | —N/a | Elden Ring | Elden Ring | Elden Ring | | Vampire Survivors |
| Narrative | | Horizon Forbidden West | God of War Ragnarök | | Pentiment | | Immortality |
| Technical Achievement | | —N/a | | Elden Ring | God of War Ragnarök | | Horizon Forbidden West |
| Multiplayer / Online | | Elden Ring | Splatoon 3 | Final Fantasy XIV: Endwalker | —N/a | | Elden Ring |
| Action | | —N/a | Bayonetta 3 | Vampire Survivors | —N/a | | |
| Adventure | | —N/a | God of War Ragnarök | | —N/a | | |
| Family | | —N/a | Kirby and the Forgotten Land | Mario + Rabbids Sparks of Hope | —N/a | | Kirby and the Forgotten Land |
| Fighting | | —N/a | Multiversus | | —N/a | | |
| Role-Playing | | —N/a | Elden Ring | | —N/a | | |
| Sports/Racing | Sports | —N/a | Gran Turismo 7 | OlliOlli World | —N/a | | |
| Sports/Racing | Racing | —N/a | Gran Turismo 7 | Gran Turismo 7 | —N/a | | |
| Strategy/Simulation | | —N/a | Mario + Rabbids Sparks of Hope | Dwarf Fortress | —N/a | | |
| Social Impact | | —N/a | As Dusk Falls | —N/a | Citizen Sleeper | | Endling: Extinction is Forever |
| Special Award | | —N/a | | Hall of Fame | Pioneer Award | Lifetime Achievement | BAFTA Fellowship |
| Special Award | | —N/a | | Tim Schafer | Mabel Addis | John Romero | Shuhei Yoshida |

== Major events ==
| Date | Event | Ref. |
|---|---|---|
| January 1 | Ian Livingstone, co-founder of Games Workshop and president of Eidos Interactive, was knighted for his service to the online games industry. | |
| January 4 | Monster Games, notable for the NASCAR Heat series and Excite Truck, was acquired by iRacing.com Motorsport Simulations. | |
| January 10 | Take-Two Interactive announced its intent to acquire Zynga. | |
| January 13 | Team17 acquired astragon in a deal worth £83 million. | |
| January 17 | Tencent acquired Sumo Group. | |
| January 18 | Microsoft announced its intent to acquire Activision Blizzard for $69 billion. | |
| January 31 | Sony Interactive Entertainment announced that it would be acquiring Bungie for $3.6 billion. The deal was closed in July 2022. | |
| January 31 | The New York Times Company acquired the viral browser game Wordle for an undisclosed seven-figure sum. | |
| February 14 | Focus Entertainment completed its acquisition of Leikr Studio. | |
| February 16 | Nacon announced its intent to acquire Daedalic Entertainment. | |
| February 22 | Tencent announced its acquisition of Inflexion Studios, developers of upcoming game Nightingale. | |
| February 22–24 | Academy of Interactive Arts & Sciences hosted the 2022 D.I.C.E. Summit and 25th Annual D.I.C.E. Awards at the Mandalay Bay Resort in Las Vegas, Nevada; Ed Boon inducted into the AIAS Hall of Fame, and Phil Spencer received the Lifetime Achievement Award. | |
| February 24 | Nintendo announced its acquisition of long-time development partner SRD, with the deal closed on April 1. | |
| February 25 | Tencent announced its acquisition of 1C Entertainment. | |
| March 2 | Netflix announced its intent to acquire Finnish video game developer Next Games for €65 million. | |
| March 2 | Epic Games announced its acquisition of internet music company Bandcamp for an undisclosed amount. | |
| March 8 | Atari SA acquired online video game database MobyGames for million. | |
| March 14 | Embracer Group acquired Dark Horse Media, the parent company of Dark Horse Comics and Dark Horse Entertainment. | |
| March 21 | Sony Interactive Entertainment announced its intent to acquire Haven Studios, making it the first development team of Sony in Canada. | |
| March 21–25 | The Game Developers Conference was held in San Francisco, California. | |
| March 24 | Netflix acquired mobile game developer Boss Fight Entertainment. | |
| March 31 | Entertainment Software Association announced that E3 2022 was canceled, both in-person and online. | |
| April 13 | Embracer Group acquired Beamdog and placed it within Saber Interactive's Aspyr unit. | |
| April 27 | The Kirby franchise celebrated its 30th anniversary in Japan. | |
| May 1 | Embracer Group announced its intent to acquire the assets of Square Enix Europe, including studios Crystal Dynamics, Eidos-Montréal, and Square Enix Montreal along with associated intellectual properties from Square Enix for million. The deal closed by August 26, 2022. | |
| May 4 | Source code of 3D Movie Maker is finally released. | |
| May 9 | Leaked source code and builds of Duke Nukem Forever, dating August and October 2001 are leaked. | |
| May 5 | IMAX closed deal with The Game Awards and Summer Game Fest to have the events be shown in select theaters in the United States, Canada and United Kingdom. | |
| May 10 | Electronic Arts formally withdrew from its license with FIFA after nearly 30 years. | |
| May 23 | Quality assurance testers at Raven Software formed a union. | |
| June 10–16 | Due to the cancellation of E3 2022, several presentations similar to it were made, including shows in association with the Summer Game Fest. | |
| July 12 | Nordisk Games announced its acquisition of Supermassive Games. | |
| July 14 | Nintendo began acquisition of animation studio Dynamo Pictures, with plans to rename it to Nintendo Pictures. The acquisition closed on October 3, 2022. | |
| July 18 | Sony Interactive Entertainment announced that it would be acquiring Repeat.gg, esports tournament platform. | |
| July 19 | Nintendo announced that the Nintendo eShop for Nintendo 3DS and Wii U would be shut down on March 27, 2023. | |
| August 5 | Arcade1Up revealed a Marvel vs. Capcom 2 arcade cabinet at Evo, making it available for the first time since its delisting from PSN and Xbox Live Arcade in 2013 (as well as the Apple App Store). | |
| August 18 | Embracer Group acquired seven companies including Tripwire Interactive and Limited Run Games as well as exclusive rights to the Middle-earth intellectual property for video and board games. | |
| August 18–20 | Quakecon was held as a virtual event. | |
| August 18–21 | The 2022 Pokémon World Championships take place in London, the first event ever held in Europe, and the first time the event has been held outside North America. | |
| August 24–28 | Gamescom took place both as a physical event at Koelnmesse in Cologne, Germany, and online. | |
| August 29 | Sony Interactive Entertainment acquired Savage Game Studios as their first mobile development studio. | |
| August 31 | NetEase acquired Quantic Dream for an undisclosed sum. | |
| September 15–18 | The Tokyo Game Show took place both as a physical event at Makuhari Messe in Chiba and online. | |
| September 18 | 90 videos showing 50 minutes of work-in-progress footage of a Grand Theft Auto game leaked after a security breach at Rockstar Games. Jason Schreier confirmed with sources at Rockstar that the footage was real. | |
| September 29 | Google announced that the company's cloud streaming service Google Stadia will officially be shut down on January 18, 2023. | |
| October 3 | Fandom acquired GameSpot, GameFAQs, Giant Bomb, and Metacritic, among others, from Red Ventures for $55 million. | |
| October 7 | Electronic Arts shuts down its Origin PC gaming launcher and online store service. | |
| October 11 | Meta acquired Armature Studio and Twisted Pixel Games. | |
| October 15–30 | The International 2022, the 11th iteration of the annual Dota 2 global esports tournament, was held in Singapore. | |
| October 16 | Second incarnation of the gaming-focused TV network G4 was shut down by parent Comcast less than a year after its relaunch in November 2021. | |
| October 31 | Netflix acquired Spry Fox as its sixth inhouse studio. | |
| November 1 | Square Enix Montreal, which was briefly renamed Onoma, was closed less than three months after Embracer Group completed its acquisition. | |
| November 11 | Krafton announced the acquisition of Neon Giant. | |
| November 15 | Thunderful Group acquired Jumpship for an undisclosed sum. | |
| December 8 | The U.S. Federal Trade Commission moved to block the proposed acquisition of Activision Blizzard by Microsoft. | |
| December 8 | The Game Awards 2022 was held at the Microsoft Theater in Los Angeles. | |
| December 16 | John Carmack announced his departure from Meta as its CTO. | |

=== Ukrainian support ===
During the 2022 Russian invasion of Ukraine launched in February that year, several video game developers and publishers with ties to Eastern Europe provided support for Ukrainian aid. On February 24, 11 bit studios pledged to donate all profits earned over the following seven days from This War of Mine (2014) and its downloadable content to the Ukrainian Red Cross. CD Projekt Red donated 1 million zloty (about €182,000) to the Polish Humanitarian Action group. Embracer Group donated $1 million to Red Cross, SOS Children's Villages, and ACT Alliance, among other charities. SCS Software donated over €20,000 to "multiple charities", and released new DLC for American Truck Simulator and Euro Truck Simulator 2 to raise funds for Ukrainian charities. The Pokémon Company and Niantic announced they would donate $200K each, alongside an addition $75K raised by Niantic employees, to organisations such as GlobalGiving to provide humanitarian relief in Ukraine. In addition, Niantic announced the suspended availability of Pokémon Go, Pikmin Bloom, and Ingress in both Russia and Belarus.

Electronic Arts, Microsoft, and Activision Blizzard, among others, halted sales of physical and digital products into Russia during the conflict. Electronic Arts announced on March 2 that it had started the process to remove the Russia national football team and Russian football clubs from its FIFA series as well as removing the Belarusian and Russian national teams and their club teams from NHL 22. In addition to preventing purchase of their games in Russia, Nintendo announced on March 9 that Advance Wars 1+2: Re-Boot Camp, a tactical war game with a faction based on Soviet-era Russia, would be indefinitely delayed due to "recent world events".

Two game bundles offered by itch.io and Humble Bundle raised over $6 million and $20 million for Ukraine aid support, respectively. Epic Games made all proceeds from Fortnite during the last two weeks of March 2022 go to charitable aid for Ukraine, and raised over $144 million.

In total nearly $200 million was donated to Ukrainian humanitarian relief efforts by gaming companies.

== Notable deaths ==
- January 4 – Russell Lees, 60, narrative writer for Ubisoft and the Assassin's Creed, Far Cry, and Watch Dogs series.
- January 5 – Stewart Gilray, 51, founder of Just Add Water, developer of the Oddworld series.
- February 28 – Kim Jung-ju, 54, founder of Nexon.
- March 14 – Scott Hall, 63, pro wrestler who appeared in WWE and WCW titles (appeared on the cover of WWF Royal Rumble, WWF King of the Ring, WWF Rage in the Cage, and WWF Raw)
- March 27 – Mohammad Fahmi, 32, creator of Coffee Talk
- March 29 – Scott Bennie, 61, developer writer for multiple role-playing games including the Fallout series
- April 12 – Gilbert Gottfried, 67, voice actor (Iago in Aladdin/Kingdom Hearts and Mister Mxyzptlk in Lego Batman 3 and Lego DC Super-Villains)
- April 26 – Robert "Razerguy" Krakoff, 81, co-founder of Razer Inc.
- May 9 – David Ward, 75, co-founder of Ocean Software
- May – Rieko Kodama, 59, developer for Sega, including lead developer on Phantasy Star and Skies of Arcadia
- June 9 – Billy Kametz, 35, voice actor (Rui in Demon Slayer: Kimetsu no Yaiba and Blue in Pokémon Masters EX)
- June 22 – Bernie Stolar, 75, former president of Sega of America, founder of Sony Computer Entertainment of America
- June – Technoblade, 23, Minecraft YouTuber
- July 4 – Kazuki Takahashi, 60, creator of Yu-Gi-Oh! which had numerous video games
- July 6 - James Caan, actor best known for portraying Sonny Corleone in The Godfather and its video game adaptation.
- July 15 – Robert Alan Koeneke, 62, creator of Moria
- July 27 – Mary Alice, 85, actress known for portraying The Oracle in The Matrix Revolutions and the video games Enter The Matrix and The Matrix Online.
- August 30 – Mitsuhiro Yoshida, 61, developer of River City Ransom
- September 3 – Mike Fahey, 49, writer and editor of the website Kotaku
- October 1/2 – Rob Smith, editor and writer for PC Gamer, OXM, and PSM.
- October 12 – Tony "RSGloryAndGold" Winchester, 69, RuneScape player on Twitch
- October 14 – Jan Rabson, 68, voice actor most notable as the voice of Larry Laffer in the Leisure Suit Larry series
- October 15 – Ferret Baudoin, lead/senior game designer for multiple action-RPG games including Neverwinter Nights 2, Dragon Age 2, Fallout 4, and Fallout 76
- October 29 – Ryan Karazija, 40, front man and lead singer of Low Roar, and composer of the soundtrack to Death Stranding
- November 10 – Kevin Conroy, 66, voice actor best known as the voice of Batman
- November 19 – Jason David Frank, 49, actor best known for his role as the original Green and White Rangers in the Power Rangers franchise.
- December 17 – Archer Maclean, 60, developer of Commodore 64 games including Dropzone and International Karate

== Hardware releases ==
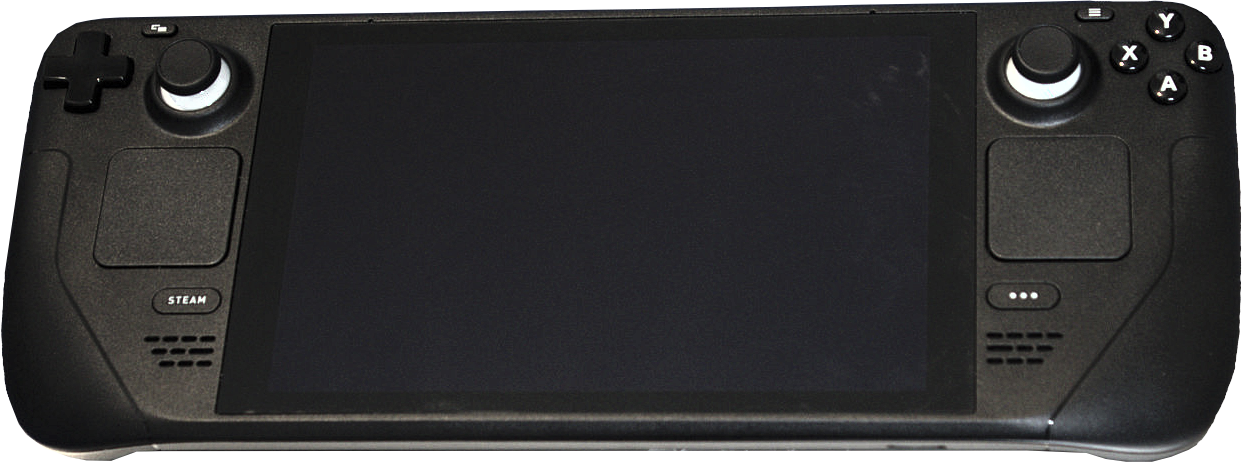
Steam Deck

| Date | Console | Manufacturer | Ref. |
|---|---|---|---|
| February 25 | Steam Deck | Valve Corporation | |
| March 1 | Amazon Luna | Amazon | |
| March 25 | A500 Mini | Retro Games Ltd. | |
| April 18 | Playdate | Panic Inc. | |
| July 28 | Astro City Mini V | Sega | |
| October 18 | PICO 4 | ByteDance | |
| October 25 | Meta Quest Pro | Reality Labs | |
| October 27 | Sega Genesis Mini 2 | Sega, M2 | |
| November 24 | Evercade EXP | Blaze Entertainment | |
| December | Ayaneo 2 | Ayaneo | |

== Cancelled games ==
- The Callisto Protocol (PS4, PS5, WIN, XBO, XSX/S; Japan only)
- Metal Max: Wild West (NS, PS4)

== Video game-based film and television releases ==
| Title | Date | Type | Distributor(s) | Franchise | Original game publisher(s) | Ref. |
|---|---|---|---|---|---|---|
| Ninjala | January 8, 2022 | Anime television series | TV Tokyo (Japan); YouTube (international) (Note: The series' episodes are posted weekly on Ninjala's YouTube channel, and are available for only a week.) | Ninjala | GungHo Online Entertainment | |
| GameStop: Rise of the Players | January 28, 2022 | Documentary film | Super LTD | —N/a | —N/a | |
| Angry Birds: Summer Madness | January 28, 2022 | Animated television series | Netflix | Angry Birds | Rovio Entertainment | |
| Shenmue: The Animation | February 6, 2022 | Anime television series | Adult Swim; Crunchyroll | Shenmue | Sega | |
| The Cuphead Show! | February 18, 2022 | Animated television series | Netflix | Cuphead | Studio MDHR | |
| Uncharted | February 18, 2022 | Feature film | Sony Pictures Releasing | Uncharted | Sony Interactive Entertainment | |
| Halo | March 24, 2022 | Television series | Paramount+ | Halo | Xbox Game Studios | |
| Sonic the Hedgehog 2 | April 8, 2022 | Feature film | Paramount Pictures | Sonic the Hedgehog | Sega | |
| Pokémon: Hisuian Snow | May 18, 2022 | Limited anime webseries | YouTube; Pokémon TV | Pokémon | Nintendo; The Pokémon Company | |
| Players | June 16, 2022 | Television series | Paramount+ | League of Legends | Riot Games | |
| Resident Evil | July 14, 2022 | Television series | Netflix | Resident Evil | Capcom | |
| Tekken: Bloodline | August 18, 2022 | Anime television series | Netflix | Tekken | Bandai Namco Entertainment | |
| Cyberpunk: Edgerunners | September 13, 2022 | Limited anime series | Netflix | Cyberpunk 2077 | CD Projekt | |
| Pokémon: The Arceus Chronicles | September 23, 2022 (Note: The limited series debuted on Amazon Prime Video in Japan in January 2022 and debuted on Netflix worldwide (except in Asia) as a feature film in September.) | Limited anime webseries | Amazon Prime Video (Japan); Netflix (int'l except Asia) | Pokémon | Nintendo; The Pokémon Company | |
| Legend of Mana: The Teardrop Crystal | October 7, 2022 | Anime television series | MBS, TBS (Japan) | Legend of Mana | Square Enix | |
| Mortal Kombat Legends: Snow Blind | October 11, 2022 | Animated film | Warner Bros. Home Entertainment | Mortal Kombat | Midway Games | |
| Arknights: Prelude to Dawn | October 28, 2022 | Anime television series | TV Tokyo (Japan) | Arknights | Yostar | |
| Fantasy Football | November 25, 2022 | Sports comedy film | Paramount+ | Madden NFL | EA Sports | |
| Dragon Age: Absolution | December 9, 2022 | Animated television series | Netflix | Dragon Age | BioWare | |
| Sonic Prime | December 15, 2022 | CGI animated television series | Netflix | Sonic the Hedgehog | Sega | |

== See also ==
- 2022 in esports
- 2022 in games
