= 2022 in games =

This page lists board and card games, wargames, miniatures games, and tabletop role-playing games published in 2022. For video games, see 2022 in video gaming.

== Games released or invented in 2022 ==
- Avatar Legends: The Roleplaying Game
- Blood on the Clocktower
- Brindlewood Bay
- Captivade
- Die
- Dorfromantik: The Board Game
- Flamecraft
- Frosthaven
- Jurassic World: The Legacy of Isla Nublar
- Quacks & Co.: Quedlinburg Dash
- Rosenstrasse
- Trophy RPG
- Women are Werewolves

== Game awards given in 2022 ==
The winners for the Spiel des Jahres (in English: Game of the Year), were Cascadia by Randy Flynn, published by Flatout Games/AEG/Kosmos. The Kennerspiel des Jahres (in English: Connoisseur Game of the Year) was won by Living Forest by Aske Christiansen (published by Pegasus Spiele). Finally, Zauberberg (Magic Mountain in English), designed by Jens-Peter Schliemann and Bernhard Weber (published by Amigo) won The Kinderspiel des Jahres (Children's Game of the Year).

The winner of the German Game Prize, voted by game retailers, professionals and clubs in Germany, Austria and Switzerland, is Ark Nova by Mathias Wigge (published by Feuerland Spiele).

The Diana Jones Award for Outstanding Achievement in Board Games was awarded on the 3 rd August 2022 at Gen Con in Indianapolis. In 2022, the award was given to Ajit George, an advocate for games. He was recognised for his work within the board games industry, promoting inclusivity and equality, over the last decade.

== Significant game-related events in 2022 ==
On April 2022, Hasbro reached a deal with Fandom (fan content company) to acquire D&D Beyond, a leading digital resource for Dungeons & Dragons, for $146.3 million in cash. On May 19th 2022 Hasbro completed its acquisition of D&D Beyond.

== Deaths ==
Date	Name	Age	Notability
January 25	Mark Tseitlin	78	Israeli chess player
January 28	Gilles Mirallès	55	French chess player
February 6	Abram Khasin	98	Russian chess international master
February 14	Borislav Ivkov	88	Serbian chess Grandmaster
March	Ralph Anspach	96	Economics professor and designer of Anti-Monopoly
March 26	Garry Leach	67	Comics and Magic: The Gathering artist
March 28	Scott Bennie	61	Role-playing game and video game designer
May 6	George Pérez	67	Comics artist who also contributed to role-playing games
May 7	Yuri Averbakh	100	Russian chess grandmaster
June 2	Ken Kelly	76	Fantasy and game artist
June 5	Aleksandr Nikitin	87	Russian chess player
June 13	Maureen Hiron		Game designer
June 13	Paul Lidberg	55	Game designer
July 13	Igor Naumkin	56	Russian chess Grandmaster
July 14	Nikolai Krogius	91	Russian chess Grandmaster
July 25	Richard Tait	58	Game designer who co-created Cranium
September 2	Mišo Cebalo	77	Croatian chess Grandmaster
September 2	Lee Hammock	45	American role-playing game and video game designer
November 29	John Prados	71	Wargame designer, notably Third Reich
December 10	Ed Cox	63	Artist for RPGs
December 12	Kim Mohan	73	Game designer and editor for TSR, New Infinities Productions, and Wizards of the Coast
December 31	Darren Watts	53	Game designer, one of the founders of DOJ Inc., and president of Hero Games

== See also ==
- List of game manufacturers
- 2022 in video gaming
