= Scotland Yard (board game) =

1983 board game

- Logo
- Publication: 1983
- Players: 3–6
- Setup time: 5–15 minutes
- Playing time: 1 hour (player dependent)
- Chance: Initial set-up
- Age range: 10+
- Skills: Tactics, strategy, and bluffing

Scotland Yard is a board game in which a team of players controlling different detectives cooperate to track down a player controlling a criminal as they move around a board representing the streets of London. It was first published in 1983 by Ravensburger and is named after Scotland Yard which is the headquarters of London's Metropolitan Police Service in real-life. Scotland Yard is an asymmetric board game, during which the detective players cooperatively solve a variant of the pursuit–evasion problem.

The game is published by Ravensburger in most of Europe and Canada and by Milton Bradley in the United States. It received the Spiel des Jahres (Game of the Year) award in 1983, the same year that it was published.

== Gameplay ==
One player controls 'Mr. X': a criminal whose location is only revealed periodically throughout gameplay. The other players each control at least one detective, all of which are always present on the board. In the Milton Bradley version, there are always five detectives on the board, so with less than six players, one player can control two or three detectives.

=== Setup ===
Schematic network game board diagram for Scotland Yard (Milton Bradley version)

Each player draws one card for each piece under their control to determine their starting location(s), with Mr. X drawing first. The detectives place their tokens at the locations they drew, but Mr. X does not. The locations on the cards are spaced far enough apart to ensure that Mr. X cannot be caught in the first round of play. There are a total of 199 spaces ("stations") on the board.

=== Movement ===
Movement is governed by using transportation tokens ("tickets"), which allow passage between spaces according to the following modes:

- Taxis, which allow the player to move only one space per turn, but can be used anywhere.
- Buses, which are spaced further apart and allow a player to cover more distance in a single trip.
- The Underground, whose stations are spaced even further apart than the bus stops and allow long-distance travel.
- Ferries, which only Mr. X can use with a black ticket, allowing him to follow routes along the River Thames between Greenwich and Whitehall.

Each detective begins with a finite mix of taxi, bus, and underground tickets. Mr. X starts with the remaining transport tickets; however, detectives must turn their used tickets over to Mr. X, effectively giving that player unlimited travel resources.

From any given space, movement is possible along a line matching the mode of transportation (taxi, bus, or underground) to the closest adjacent space for that mode. Each space is coloured to indicate the modes of transportation available there: yellow for taxis, green for buses, red for the Underground. For example, a player at space #74 could move as follows:

- Taxi to 58, 73, 75, or 92 (closest taxi stop spaces connected by a solid yellow line)
- Bus to 58 or 94 (closest bus stop spaces connected by a solid green line)
- Underground to 46 (sole closest underground stop space connected by a broken red line)

Mr. X also has a supply of black tickets that are valid for any mode of transport available at their current location. These tickets can also be used to move between the ferry stops on the River Thames, joined by black lines; Mr. X is the only one who can travel in this manner. In addition, the player assuming the role of Mr. X is given several double-move tokens, which allows them to make two moves in a single turn.

A space may be occupied by only one (visible) pawn at a time. If an adjacent space is already occupied, the pawn may not be moved there. However, a player travelling by bus or underground may bypass an occupied space if the closest adjacent stop in that direction is open.

Mr. X's movements are documented through a "travel log" with paper inserts, divided into slots that are covered by used tickets. For each move that Mr. X makes, they write down their destination secretly and then cover it with the ticket they have used to reach it, thus providing the detectives with clues as to their whereabouts. The first number written down is not the starting space, but is the first destination using the ticket displayed. If a double move is used, Mr. X must log both moves separately, use a transportation ticket for each one, and surrender one of the double move tickets. Mr. X moves first on every turn, after which the detectives move in any order.

Detectives may not trade, give away, or combine their tickets, and a player controlling multiple detectives must keep their ticket supplies separate. If a detective reaches a location from which they cannot move (e.g. holding only Underground tickets while at a taxi/bus stop), they become stranded and must remain at that location until the game is over.

At five specific times during the game, Mr. X has to reveal their current position. The windows on the travel log for these moves are shaped differently to remind the player to do so. Detectives may take this opportunity to refine their search and, if possible, plan ways to encircle them based on where they are and the next few moves they make. Should one of these five moments occur on the first half of a double move, Mr. X makes the first move, places their pawn on the space visited and allows the detectives to see it, then removes it and makes the second move.

=== Objective ===
The detectives win the game if any of them lands on Mr. X's current location, or if it becomes impossible for Mr. X to move without landing on a detective. Mr. X wins by avoiding capture until all detectives can no longer move because they have either exhausted their ticket supplies or reached positions from which they cannot move because they have no usable tickets.

=== Equipment ===
	Ravensburger (2013)		Milton Bradley (1985)
Taxi	57		54
Bus	45		43
Underground	23		
Concealed	5		
Double Move	3		2
Starting positions	Detectives: 51, 127, 166, 170	Mr. X: 103, 155	13, 26, 29, 34, 50, 53, 91, 94, 103, 112, 117, 132, 138, 141, 155, 174, 197, 198

The game was updated with slightly different rules and equipment in 2013. The 2013 Ravensburger and 1985 Milton Bradley editions vary slightly in the number of transportation tickets, double-move, and starting position cards included, as noted. In the Milton Bradley version, there are 18 starting position cards, shared by both the detectives and Mr. X. In the 2013 edition, the 29 start cards are split into two separate pools, one for Mr. X and another for the detectives.

In a game with five or fewer players, up to two of the pawns meant to represent the detectives may instead be designated as "bobbies", indicated by placing a circular ring on them. Bobbies can move freely throughout the city without using tickets; during the detectives' turn, they decide by consensus whether and where to move each one.

As published by Ravensburger in 2013, it contains:

- 1 game board (a map of Central London)
- 6 colored playing pieces
- 130 transportation tickets
- 1 label sheet
- 29 start cards
- 3 double-move tokens
- 1 travel log and paper inserts
- 1 storage tray to be used to store tickets, start cards and playing pieces

Renumbered spaces
R	MB
171	200
159	171
128	159
118	128
108	118

The main game board also varies slightly between the Milton Bradley (1985) and Ravensburger editions. The primary difference between these is in the numbering of the stations: five stations are numbered differently, with 108 missing from the Milton Bradley boards and 200 missing from the Ravensburger boards. Aside from the numbering differences, some of the routes have been revised since the initial publication. For instance, stations 198 and 199 are connected by a bus line in earlier boards, which is changed to a taxi line, and the taxi line between stations 13 and 14 in early boards was later removed.

== Alternative versions ==
The game has been adapted to take place on maps of different cities. Scotland Yard Tokyo, also distributed by Ravensburger is set on the streets of Tokyo; the major difference is game aesthetics. Scotland Yard: Swiss Edition uses the same gameplay and is set in Switzerland, with the addition of more boat routes and ski areas available only to Mr. X.

NY Chase is a version based on New York City. In this version, detectives do not hand their used tokens over, and they have access to roadblocks and a helicopter, tilting the game more in favour of those playing as detectives.

A faster travel version called Die Jagd Nach Mister X exists that functions quite differently. In this version, Mr. X's location is only hidden when a black travel token is used, and the game is essentially an open chase around London. Evasion is accomplished with black tokens and using the fastest travel to distant locations. In this version, each player takes turns as Mr. X, and points collected (in the form of the detectives' used travel tokens) determine the overall winner.

== Alternative rules ==
In 1986, Alain Munoz and Serge Laget posted an article in the French magazine Jeux & Stratégie suggesting alternative rules to balance and expand the game.

Spanish company Cefa published Alerta Roja (Red Alert) in 1986, which is generally a remake of Scotland Yard with minor variations to the rules and a different theme (secret agents chase a nuclear terrorist though the sewers of a futuristic city).

=== Beginners ===
Ravensburger has published rules designed to introduce new players to the game. In the "beginners version", Mr. X starts on space 82, and the detectives start on 41, 46, and/or 124, with 142 added if four detectives are playing. The number of turns is reduced to 13, underground tickets are not used, and Mr. X is limited to one concealed-move ticket and one double-move ticket.

== Adaptations ==
The game was first adapted for the Game Boy in 1990, and then as Scotland Yard Interactive for the Philips CD-I in 1993. It was adapted for Windows by Cryo Interactive in 1998, for the Nintendo DS by Sproing Interactive in 2008, as well as for iPhone (2012) and Android (2015) by Ravensburger Digital.

== Reception ==
Games included Scotland Yard in its top 100 games of 1986, calling it "a suspenseful chase through the streets of London in this game of deduction and bluff." The reviewer noted "Trapping Mr. X requires logic and teamwork; eluding the detectives takes sneakiness and an occasional risky move by Mr. X." A review from Lautapeliopas praised the game's accessibility and functionality, but said the playing as detectives is less engaging.

== Reviews ==
- Jeux & Stratégie #21
- 1983 Games 100
- Family Games: The 100 Best

== See also ==
- Captivade - a 2022 board game with similar mechanics
