= Ninth generation of video game consoles =

Gaming generation since 2020

The ninth generation of video game consoles began in November 2020 with the releases of Microsoft's Xbox Series X and Series S console family and Sony's PlayStation 5.

Compared to the eighth generation consoles Xbox One and PlayStation 4, the new consoles add faster computation and graphics processors, support for real-time ray tracing graphics, output for 4K resolution, and in some cases, 8K resolution, with rendering speeds targeting 60 frames per second (FPS) or higher. Internally, both console families introduced new internal solid-state drive (SSD) systems to be used as high-throughput memory and storage systems for games to reduce or eliminate loading times and support in-game streaming. The Xbox Series S and the PlayStation 5 Digital Edition lack an optical drive while retaining support for online distribution and storing games on external USB devices.

Despite much weaker processing power and already previously competing with eighth-generation consoles, the original Nintendo Switch has also been noted as a competitor to ninth-generation consoles, particularly with the introduction of the "OLED Model" revision in 2021; a successor, the Nintendo Switch 2, was released in June 2025. Other handheld personal computer devices such as the Steam Deck introduced means to play Linux games, as well as most Windows games through Proton, on-the-go, further expanding hardware competition in the generation.

== Background ==
The duration from the eighth generation until the start of the ninth was one of the longest in history, having started on November 18, 2012, with the release of Nintendo's Wii U. Past generations typically had five-year windows as a result of Moore's law, but Sony and Microsoft instead launched mid-console redesigns the PlayStation 4 Pro and Xbox One X between November 10, 2016 and November 7, 2017. Microsoft also launched a monthly console lease program, with the option to buy or upgrade. Some analysts believed these factors signaled the first major shift away from the idea of console generations because the potential technical gains of new hardware had become nominal.

Microsoft and Sony had announced their new consoles in 2019 for release by the end of 2020, prior to the COVID-19 pandemic. When the pandemic struck in March 2020, it impacted both marketing and production of the consoles. The cancelled E3 2020 had been planned as a major venue to premiere the consoles, and instead both Microsoft and Sony turned to online showcases to highlight the systems and launch games. Both companies acknowledged that the pandemic had strained their production supplies due to hardware manufacturing slowdowns starting in March 2020, but would not impact their console release windows, and they set consumer expectations that console supplies would likely be limited in the launch window and would slowly become more relaxed as the pandemic waned. This created a wave of scalping through online stores, which was countered by manufacturers and vendors. The then-ongoing global chip shortage continued to affect console shipments through the end of 2021, with Sony warning of lower production numbers during the final calendar quarter of the year and into 2022; this also affected Nintendo's Switch console production rates and Valve's plans to release the portable Steam Deck handheld gaming computer, from its planned December 2021 release date to February 2022.

A combination of factors including the global memory supply shortage, tariffs placed by the United States, and later the 2026 Iran war had led to both Sony and Microsoft to raise the base prices of their systems during 2025 and 2026.

== Home consoles ==
=== PlayStation 5 ===
The PlayStation 5 was developed by Sony as the successor to the PlayStation 4 and was first released on November 12, 2020. The primary goal of the PlayStation 5's development was to reduce loading times in games, particularly those that use in-game streaming such as when the player moves across an open world. Sony developed a custom solid-state drive (SSD) architecture based on a 12-channel, 825 GB SSD along with a fast software decompression method that enables an input/output speed of up to 8 to 9 GB/s. In most early development tests, this virtually eliminated loading screens and masking loading times for open world games. The main system is backed by an AMD Zen 2 system on a chip running at a variable frequency capped at 3.5 GHz, and a RDNA 2 GPU also running at a variable frequency capped at 2.23 GHz. The GPU has a total potential processing power of 10.28 teraflops. The system comes with 16 GB of memory.

The PlayStation 5 was launched with two models. The base model includes an optical disc reader for most disc formats including Blu-ray, UHD Blu-ray, and retail PlayStation 5 games. A cheaper Digital model lacks the disc reader, but otherwise is equivalent to the base model. Both models support expanded memory options to store games and other data onto external drives, thus allowing players to obtain and store games through online distribution via the PlayStation Store. The PlayStation 5 has mostly complete backward compatibility with PlayStation 4 games, with only a limited number of games not currently supported on the console, while the PlayStation Now cloud service is available for users to play games from the older PlayStation consoles.

Mid-generation revisions of both PlayStation 5 models were announced in late 2023, both unofficially considered the PlayStation 5 Slim. The units are to replace the two original PlayStation 5 models; both will have a slimmer design as well as 1 TB of internal storage and additional USB ports. The more expensive model includes an optical disc drive, while the second model, the Digital Edition, will not ship with a drive, though a drive expansion kit will be available to users.

=== Xbox Series X and Series S ===
The Xbox Series X/S is the successor to the Xbox One and was released on November 10, 2020, in select regions. Microsoft followed the Xbox One's dual console models: a high-end line (the Series X comparable to the Xbox One X), and a cheaper model (the Series S comparable to the Xbox One S). The performance goal for the Xbox Series X was about four times that of the Xbox One X, but without sacrificing game development for the lower-end Xbox Series S.

Both the Xbox Series X and Series S use an AMD Zen 2 CPU and an RDNA 2 GPU but with different frequencies and compute units. The Series S has lower frequencies with reduced performance, and the Series X has graphics performance estimated at 12.155 teraflops compared to the Series S's 4.006 teraflops. Microsoft developed a Velocity Architecture, which includes an internal SSD system (1 TB on the Series X, 500 GB on the Series S) used for storing games and new DirectX interfaces with improved input/output and in-game texture streaming and rendering. The Series X includes an optical disc reader supporting Blu-ray and UHD media, which is absent in the Series S. Both consoles support external game storage media and online distribution via Xbox Live. Full backward compatibility was announced for all Xbox One games, including previously supported Xbox and Xbox 360 games but excluding Kinect games. Microsoft encouraged third-party developers and publishers to use its Smart Delivery approach to give Xbox One games free performance upgrade patches for Xbox Series X/S.

=== Comparison ===
The following table includes only named released models, and does not include minor hardware revisions or redesigns, such as the "slim" model of the PlayStation 5.

| Product Line | | PlayStation 5 | | | Xbox Series X/S | |
| Name | | PlayStation 5 Digital Edition | PlayStation 5 | PlayStation 5 Pro | Xbox Series S | Xbox Series X |
|---|---|---|---|---|---|---|
| Logo | | | | | | |
| Image | | | | | | |
| Image | | A PS5 Digital Edition with the DualSense controller | A standard PS5 with the DualSense controller | A standard PS5 Pro | An Xbox Series S with its controller | An Xbox Series X with its controller |
| Manufacturer | | Sony Interactive Entertainment | | | Microsoft Gaming | |
| Release dates | | PlayStation 5 AU/JP/KR/NA/NZ/SGP: November 12, 2020: WW: November 19, 2020; IND: January 22, 2021; INA: February 2, 2021; CHN: May 15, 2021; PlayStation 5 Slim: WW: November 10, 2023 | | WW: November 7, 2024 | WW: November 10, 2020; CHN: June 10, 2021 | |
| Launch prices | US$ | 399.99 | 499.99 | 699.99 | 299.99 (Note: 512 GB All-Digital) | 499.99 (Note: 1 TB Disc Drive) |
| Launch prices | € | 399.99 | 499.99 | 799.99 | 299.99 | 499.99 |
| Launch prices | GBP | 359.99 | 449.99 | 699.99 | 249.99 | 449.99 |
| Launch prices | A$ | 599.95 | 749.95 | 1,199.95 | 499 | 749 |
| Launch prices | JP¥ | 39,980 | 49,980 | 119,980 | 29,980 | 49,980 |
| Current prices | US$ | 599.99 | 649.99 | 899.99 | 399.99/449.99 (Note: 1 TB All-Digital) | 649.99/599.99/799.99 (Note: 2 TB Disc Drive) |
| Current prices | € | 599.99 | 649.99 | 899.99 | 349.99/399.99 | 599.99/549.99/699.99 |
| Current prices | GBP | 519.99 | 569.99 | 789.99 | 299.99/349.99 | 499.99/449.99/589.99 |
| Current prices | A$ | 749.95 | 829.95 | 1,399 | 549/599 | 849/749/1,049 |
| Current prices | JP¥ | 55,000 (Note: Japanese language model)/89,980 (Note: Multi-language model) | 97,980 | 137,980 | 44,578/49,978 | 66,978/59,978 |
| Sales | Shipped | 65.5 million (as of 30 June 2024) | | | 35 million (as of 25 February 2026) | |
| Sales | Sold | 95.3 million (as of 30 June 2026) | | | 35 million (as of 25 February 2026) | |
| Sales | Game media | | | | | |
| Media | Game media | Digital distribution | UHD Blu-ray, Blu-ray, digital distribution | Digital distribution (UHD Blu-ray and Blu-ray with optional disc drive) | Digital distribution | Digital distribution (all systems); UHD Blu-ray, Blu-ray, DVD, CD (systems with disc drive) |
| Media | Regional lockout | Unrestricted | | | | |
| Media | Other | UHD Blu-ray, Blu-ray, and DVD with optional disc drive | UHD Blu-ray, Blu-ray, DVD | UHD Blu-ray, Blu-ray, and DVD with optional disc drive | —N/a | UHD Blu-ray, Blu-ray, DVD, CD (systems with disc drive) |
| Media | Backward compatibility | Almost all PlayStation 4 and PlayStation VR games | | | —N/a | All Xbox One games (excluding Kinect-required games), Xbox 360 and original Xbox games playable on Xbox One (list) |
CPU
| CPU | Type | Custom AMD 8-core based on Zen 2 architecture | | | | |
| CPU | ISA | x86-64 | | | | |
| CPU | Clock speed | up to 3.5 GHz (variable) with SMT always on | | up to 3.85 GHz (variable) with SMT always on | 3.4 GHz with SMT, 3.6 GHz without SMT | 3.6 GHz with SMT, 3.8 GHz without SMT |
| CPU | Process | 7 nm (Note: 2020 & 2021 revisions) or 6 nm (Note: 2022 revision or slim) | | 4 nm | 7 nm | 7 nm or 6 nm |
| GPU | Type | Custom AMD Radeon RDNA 2 architecture | | Hybrid AMD RDNA 2 architecture with RDNA 3 features and RDNA 4 Raytracing cores | Custom AMD Radeon RDNA 2 architecture | |
| GPU | Clock speed | up to 2.233 GHz (variable) | | up to 2.35 GHz (variable) | 1.565 GHz | 1.825 GHz |
| GPU | TFLOP/s | up to 10.28 TFLOPS (variable) | | up to 18.048 TFLOPS (variable) | 4.006 TFLOPS | 12.155 TFLOPS |
| GPU | Compute units | 36 out of 40 CUs (2304 out of 2560 SMs) enabled | | 60 CU | 20 out of 24 CUs (1280 out of 1536 SMs) enabled | 52 out of 56 CUs (3328 out of 3584 SMs) enabled |
| GPU | Process | 7 nm or 6 nm | | 4 nm | 7 nm | 7 nm or 6 nm |
| Memory | Main & other | 16 GB GDDR6 SDRAM; 256-bit (unified); 512 MB DDR4 SDRAM (for background tasks) | | 16 GB GDDR6 SDRAM; 2 GB DDR5 SDRAM | 10 GB GDDR6 SDRAM; 128-bit (semi-unified) | 16 GB GDDR6 SDRAM; 320-bit (semi-unified) |
| Memory | Bandwidth | 448 GB/s | | 576 GB/s | 8 GB (128-bit) (GPU) @ 224 GB/s; 2 GB (32-bit) (system) @ 56 GB/s | 10 GB (320-bit) (GPU) @ 560 GB/s; 6 GB (3.5 GB & 2.5 GB) (192-bit) (system) @ 336 GB/s |
| Memory | Clock speed | 1.75 GHz (14 GHz effective) | | 2.25 GHz (18 GHz effective) | 1.75 GHz (14 GHz effective) | 1.75 GHz (14 GHz effective) |
| Storage | Internal | 825 GB (Note: non-slim) (Note: slim (digital, September 2025 Revisions)) or 1 TB (Note: slim (disc)) PCIe Gen 4 custom NVMe SSD | | 2 TB PCIe Gen 4 custom NVMe SSD | 512 GB or 1 TB PCIe Gen 4 custom NVMe SSD | 1 TB or 2 TB PCIe Gen 4 custom NVMe SSD |
| Storage | Reserved by OS | 161 GB | | | 200 GB | |
| Storage | External | M.2 NVMe SSD support (with September 2021 system update), USB 3.2 HDD Support (archive only for PS5 games) | | | Storage Expansion Card (up to 2 TB), USB 3.1 HDD Support (archive only for X/S games) | |
| Storage | Bandwidth | 5.5 GB/s (raw or uncompressed), 8–9 GB/s, up to 22 GB/s (compressed) | | | 2.4 GB/s (raw or uncompressed), 4.8 GB/s (compressed) | |
| Storage | Game installation | Updates are downloaded and installed automatically in Rest Mode | | | Updates are downloaded and installed automatically in Instant-on Mode | |
| Network | Wireless | Dual-band Wi-Fi 6 @ 2.4 GHz and 5 GHz | | Tri-band Wi-Fi 7 @ 2.4 GHz, 5 GHz and 6 GHz | Dual-band Wi-Fi 5 @ 2.4 GHz and 5 GHz | |
| Network | Wired | Gigabit Ethernet | | | | |
| Dimensions | | 390 × 260 × 92 mm (15.4 × 10.2 × 3.6 in); 358 × 216 × 80 mm (14.1 × 8.5 × 3.1 in) | 390 × 260 × 104 mm (15.4 × 10.2 × 4.1 in); 358 × 216 × 96 mm (14.1 × 8.5 × 3.8 in) | 388 × 216 × 89 mm (15.3 × 8.5 × 3.5 in) | 151 × 65 × 275 mm (5.9 × 2.6 × 10.8 in) | 151 × 151 × 301 mm (5.9 × 5.9 × 11.9 in) |
| Weight | | 3.9 kg (8.6 lb) (Note: 2020 revision); 3.6 kg (7.9 lb) (Note: 2021 revision); 3.4 kg (7.5 lb) (Note: 2022 revision); 2.6 kg (5.7 lb) | 4.5 kg (9.9 lb); 4.2 kg (9.3 lb); 3.9 kg (8.6 lb); 3.2 kg (7.1 lb) | 3.1 kg (6.8 lb) | 1.92 kg (4.2 lb) | 4.44 kg (9.8 lb) |
| Power | | 340 W | 350 W | 390 W | 165 W | 315 W |
| Included in the box | | DualSense wireless controller; USB Type-C to Type-A charging cable for the DualSense wireless controller; HDMI cable (compatible with Ultra High Speed defined by HDMI v2.1); AC power cord; Console base | | Same as base model, minus console base | Xbox Wireless Controller; HDMI cable (compatible with Ultra High Speed defined by HDMI v2.1); AC power cord | |
| Video | Output | HDMI: 720p, 1080i, 1080p, 1440p, 4K UHD, 8K UHD | | | HDMI: 720p, 1080p, 1440p, 4K UHD | HDMI: 720p, 1080p, 1440p, 4K UHD, 8K UHD |
| Audio | | Custom Tempest 3D Engine, supports: Dolby Atmos & DTS:X (Blu-ray and Ultra HD Blu-ray disc video when connected to a supported device), Dolby Digital (max 5.1ch), Dolby Digital Plus (max 7.1ch), Dolby TrueHD (max 7.1ch), DTS (max 5.1ch), DTS-HD High Resolution Audio (max 7.1ch), DTS-HD Master Audio (max 7.1ch), AAC (max 5.1ch), Linear PCM (max 7.1ch), up to 7.1 surround sound overall | | | Custom Project Acoustics 3D Audio; Dolby Atmos; DTS:X; 7.1 surround sound | |
| Peripheral abilities | Controller | DualSense wireless controller | | | Xbox Wireless Controller | |
| Peripheral abilities | Touch capability | DualSense controller includes a "touchpad" | | | —N/a | |
| Peripheral abilities | Camera | PS5 HD camera | | | —N/a | |
| Online services | | PlayStation Network, PlayStation Now | | | Xbox network, Xbox Game Pass | |
| Online services | | Downloads games and automatic updates in the background | | | | |
| Online services | | Paid PlayStation Plus subscription required for Cloud saves, online multiplayer, except for free-to-play titles | | | Paid Xbox Game Pass Essential subscription required for online multiplayer, except for free-to-play titles, free cloud saves | |
| Game DVR | Image | —N/a | | | | |
| Game DVR | Video | —N/a | | | | |
| Game DVR | Live streaming | Free | | | | |
| List of games | | List of PlayStation 5 games | | | List of Xbox Series X and Series S games | |
| System software | | PlayStation 5 System Software | | | Xbox Series X/S System Software | |
| System software | Updates | Updates are downloaded and installed automatically in Rest Mode | | | Updates are downloaded and installed automatically in Instant-on Mode | |
| Sources | | | | | | |

== Related platforms ==
=== Nintendo Switch and Nintendo Switch 2 ===
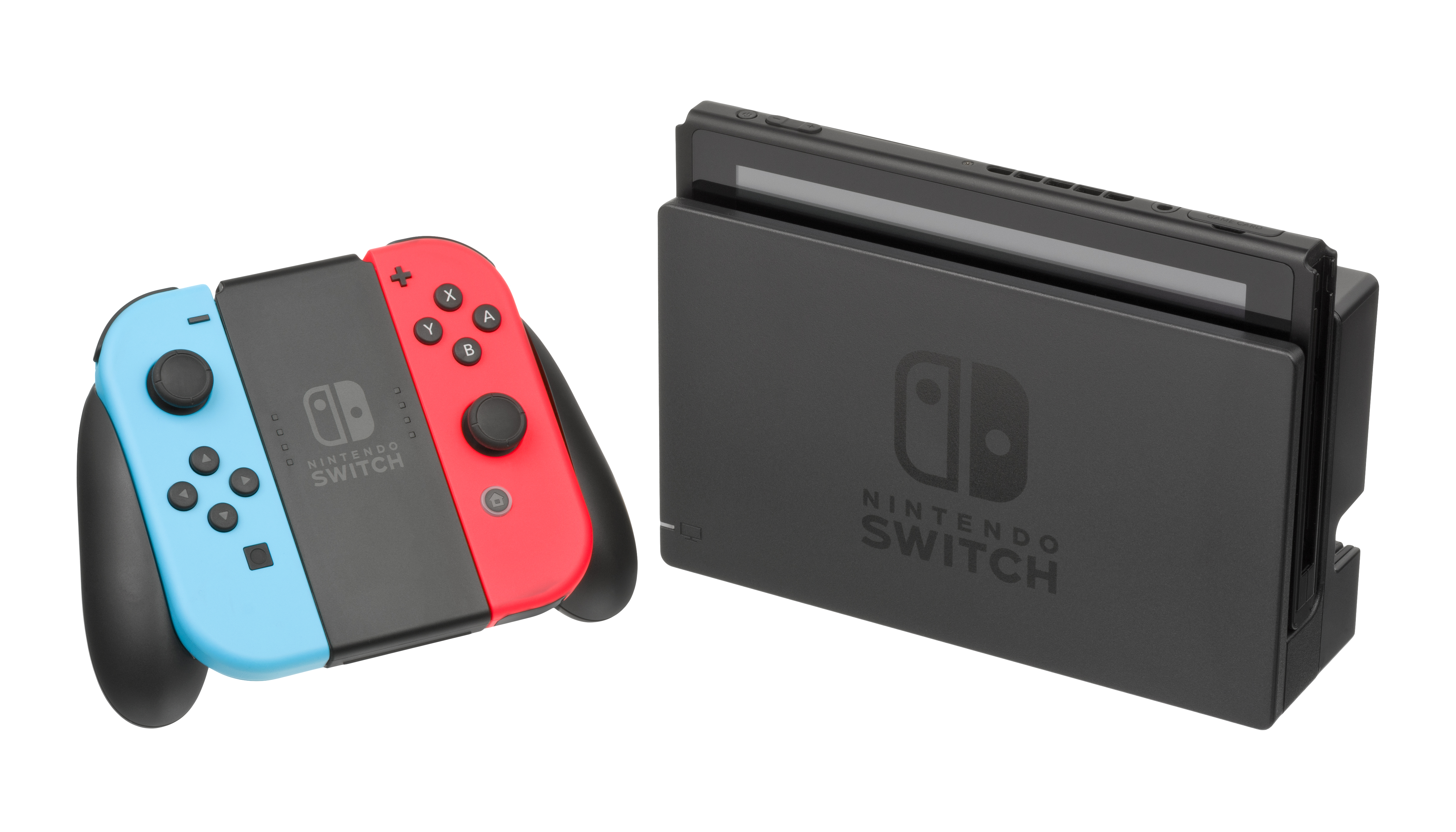
A docked original Nintendo Switch

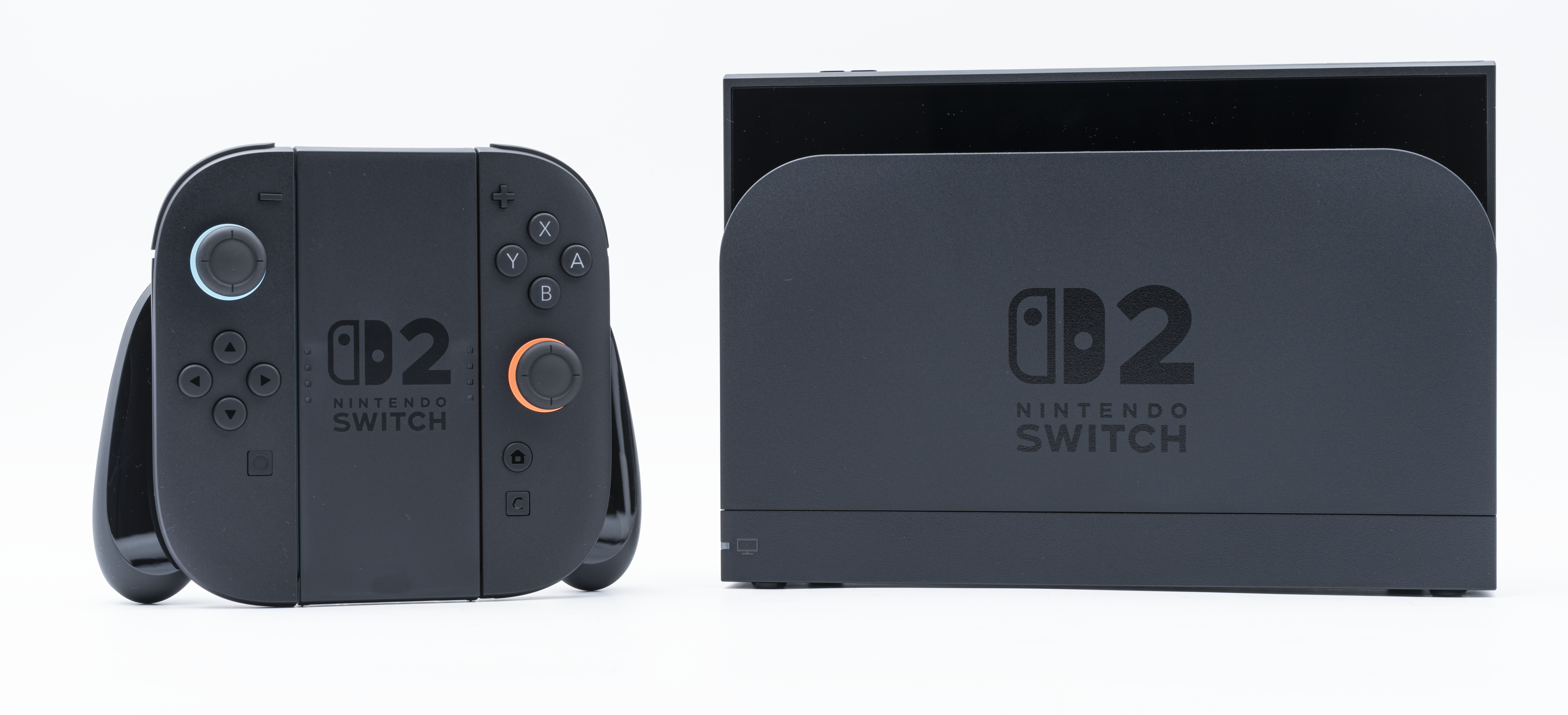
A docked Nintendo Switch 2

Despite being a holdover from the eighth-generation, the Nintendo Switch has been positioned by sources as a primary competitor to other ninth-generation consoles, due to its continued hardware and software support as of 2025. The financial failure of Nintendo's first eighth-gen console, the Wii U, resulted in the Switch's relatively late release in the eighth-generation, being released in March 2017. An "OLED Model" revision was released on October 8, 2021, introducing an updated design and improved display, though it did not introduce any performance improvements. Additionally, commercial performance of Switch-exclusive titles have remained high during the ninth-generation, with Pokémon Scarlet and Violet (2022) and The Legend of Zelda: Tears of the Kingdom (2023) both achieving 10 million units sold in their first three days after release. Nintendo announced a successor, the Nintendo Switch 2, on January 16, 2025, with it released on June 5 in the same year.

=== Steam Deck and handheld gaming PCs ===
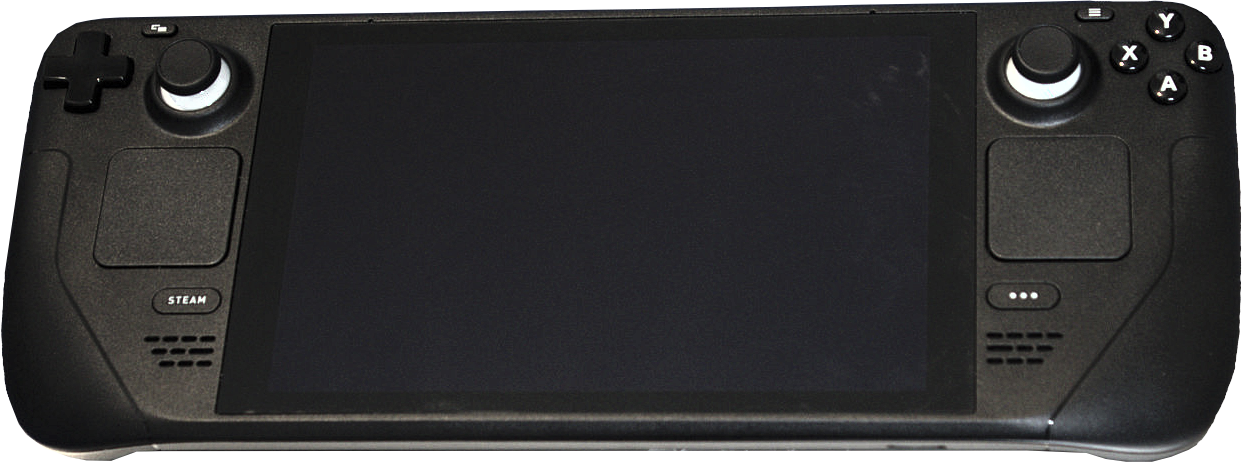
LCD-model Valve Steam Deck

On February 25, 2022, Valve released the Steam Deck, a handheld gaming PC that runs SteamOS 3.0, a Linux distribution developed by Valve. The Deck includes Valve's own Proton compatibility layer, allowing nearly all Windows-based games to run on the Deck without modification. The handheld also allows users to install Windows or other software on the device. The Steam Deck was the first handheld to use an RDNA 2 GPU, which is also used on both the home consoles of the ninth generation. The handheld was well received by many outlets, with an overall praising of its extensive game compatibility and portability.

The success of the Steam Deck led to the growth of the handheld gaming PC market and to the creation of direct competitors, such as the Asus ROG Ally, Lenovo Legion Go, MSI Claw A1M, and the Ayaneo running Microsoft Windows. The Deck's success also led Valve to introduce two new hardware units in 2026: a new Steam Machine small form factor computer using SteamOS, though built by Valve directly rather than relying on third party manufacturers as with the original Steam Machines approach; and the Steam Frame, a new VR set to replace the Steam Index along with Lepton, a Waydroid fork to allow the Frame to run Android games on SteamOS, giving the set a wider range of games to play.

=== Cloud gaming platforms ===
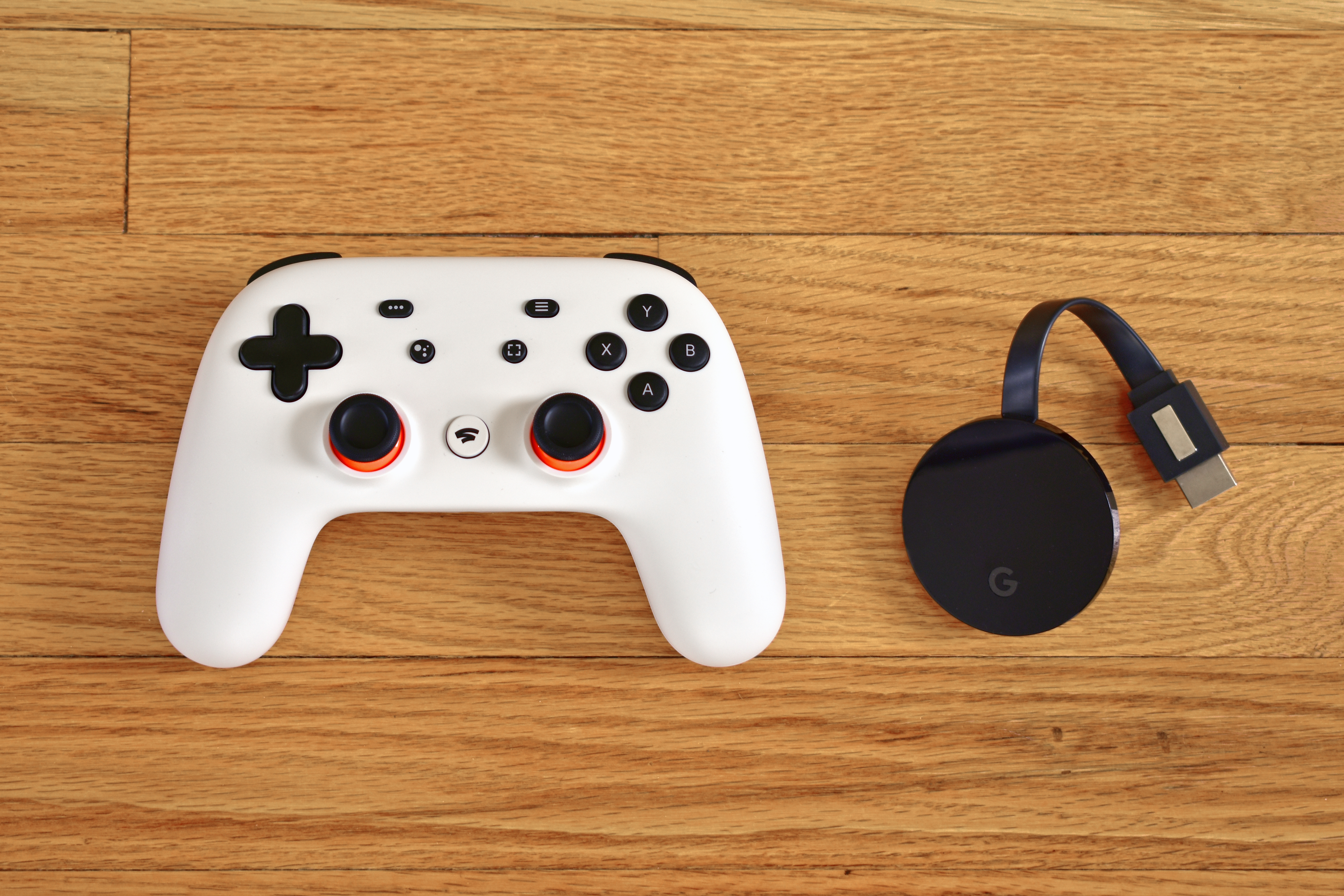
The official Stadia Controller and Chromecast Ultra (left to right), the primary way Stadia was intended to be played

Cloud gaming has become part of the gaming landscape with Stadia and Amazon Luna being introduced in November 2019 and October 2020, respectively, as well as GeForce Now coming out of its four years of beta in February 2020. None of these systems have had any financial breakthrough as home video game consoles, but they are viable for multi platform ninth generation games. Google, having failed to find a large player base, shut down Stadia on January 19, 2023.

Cloud gaming has also been used by Microsoft as part of its gaming subscription service, Xbox Game Pass. This gave Microsoft a head start in what analysts expected to be a major complementary service, supplementing the unprofitable console business and appealing to more entry-level players with better accessibility at a lower price. Microsoft's Phil Spencer said that they believed that they could not compete on the console hardware space as much as Sony or Nintendo, and shifted their strategy towards Xbox Game Pass and cloud gaming. Sony in turn revamped its PlayStation Plus subscription in mid-2022 by merging in PlayStation Now, its cloud-based service for games of past PlayStation generations, as a feature in a higher subscription tier.

The continued growth of cloud gaming services has inspired the development of handhelds like the Logitech G CLOUD Gaming Handheld and Razer Edge, which advertise cloud streaming as a key selling point.

=== Virtual reality headsets ===
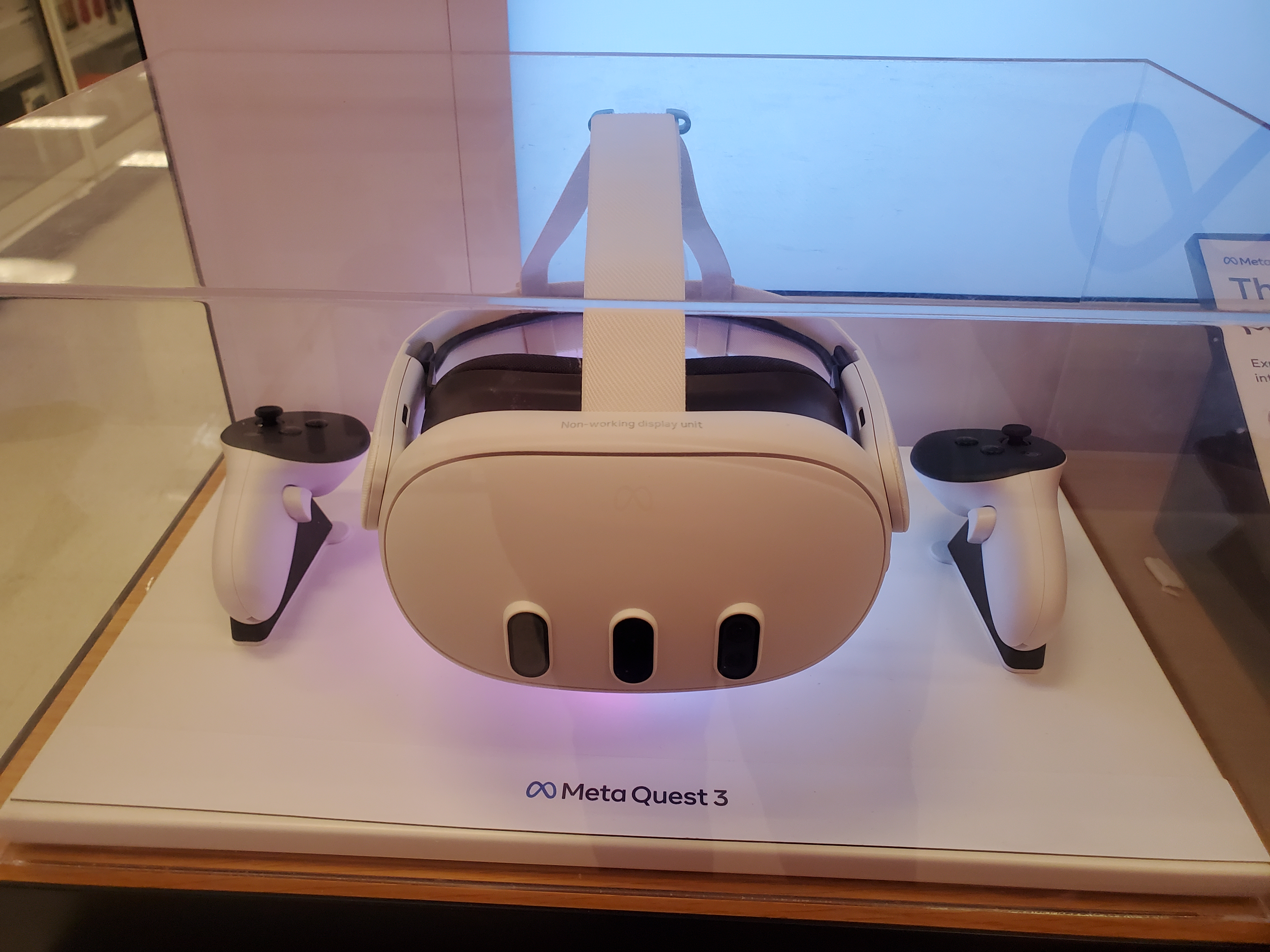
A Meta Quest 3 display-unit

The ninth generation continued the trend of virtual reality. The previous generation mainly consisted of VR accessories made for mobile games (such as Google's Cardboard/Daydream and Samsung's Gear VR) or computers (HTC Vive and the Oculus Rift). This generation has started to offer standalone headsets dedicated to virtual reality games. The Meta Quest Pro was released in 2022. Additions in 2023 included the PlayStation VR2 (a PS5 accessory serving as a successor to 2016's PlayStation VR) and the Meta Quest 3. 2024 also saw Apple's entry into the market with the release of the Apple Vision Pro.

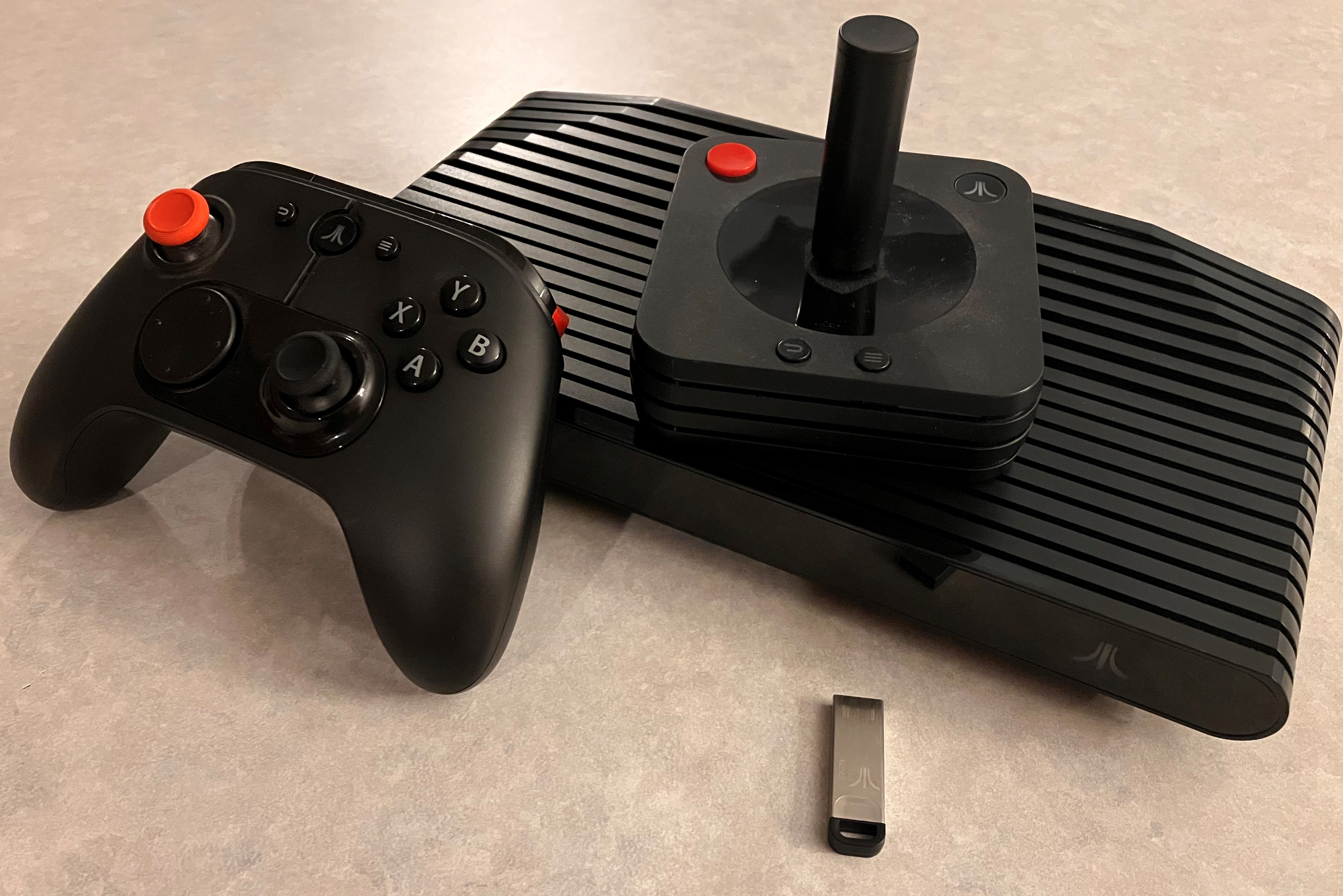
An Atari VCS and its official accessories

=== Retro-focused consoles ===
Polymega and Atari 2600+ are examples of game consoles released during the timespan of this generation, which focus on retro gaming and re-releases of older games.

While not directly focused on re-releases, Atari VCS is a Linux-based console that is pre-loaded with the compilation, Atari VCS Vault: Vol 1. Additional titles, including a selection of indie games and remakes of classic Atari games, can be purchased from the console's digital storefront.

== Trends over the ninth generation ==
Several geo-political events occurred in the mid-2020s that affected the pricing of consoles, which included the global RAM shortage due to demand for data centers to support the AI boom, the global trade war that arose from the tariffs issued during Donald Trump's second term as U.S. president, and the 2026 Iran war. All three console manufacturers announced mid-generation price increases due to these events. By 2026, costs of consoles had increased by 50% or more compared to their launch prices as a result, and because of the ongoing RAM shortage, costs for the next generation of consoles are expected to be much greater. The rising costs of hardware is expected to delay the release of the next console generation, the planned PlayStation 6 from Sony, and Project Helix from Microsoft, raising the base cost of a console to over US$1000. The memory costs alone estimated to be around US$680 for the PlayStation 6 based on October 2026 prices, while Microsoft has estimated the non-subsidized cost of Project Helix to be between US$1200 and $1800 during the same period. Sony stated by June 2026 that they would not sell hardware at a significant loss and would likely delay the PlayStation 6 release until component pricing would make it favorable, while Microsoft was reevaluating their plans for Project Helix due to the variability of the component market.

Another major trend was the resurgence of the console war between Sony and Microsoft. At the release of both the PlayStation 5 and the Xbox Series X/S, both Sony and Microsoft appeared to be heading to allow their single-player, first-party games to no longer be exclusive to their console. Sony ported several of its PlayStation Studios titles for Windows, while Microsoft began multiplatform releases from Xbox Game Studios to both the PlayStation 5 and the Nintendo Switch family. Both changed their approach in 2026. Sony's first-party titles had not been selling well over the previous years, and the company announced it would stop publishing first-party games for Windows; this move was likely in response to Microsoft's plans for Project Helix, which was expected to play both Windows and Xbox games, according to Digital Foundry. Microsoft also saw drops in hardware sales, and since February 2026, reorganized the Microsoft Gaming division, which was rebranded as Xbox. With this, several significant changes in the division's strategy were made, including changing their plans to release single-player games as Xbox exclusives.

Layoffs continued across game developers throughout this period. Some of these were attributed to the shrinkage of the market post-COVID and from acquisitions and mergers, but by 2025, a number of these were the result of high cost of game develop for AAA games, typically with the focus on high fidelity graphics. Success of games with small budgets like Clair Obscur: Expedition 33 have led to questions of the need for massive budgets that typically have been associated with AAA games. Coupled with the RAM shortage, some developers have reconsidered their target system requirements and falling back to less aggressive graphics requirements.

In July 2026, Sony announced that by January 2028 it would stop manufacturing physical discs for PlayStation games, instead relying on digital distribution. Around the same time, Rockstar Games said they would only be distributing Grand Theft Auto VI digitally, with physical copies only containing a redemption code for the digital version. The move from physical to digital media raised concerns over video game preservation as well as ownership of games.

== See also ==
- 2020s in video games
- Lists of video game consoles
  - List of home video game consoles
  - List of handheld game consoles
  - List of dedicated video game consoles
  - List of virtual reality headsets
