= The Quacks of Quedlinburg =

German board game

- Box cover
- Other names: Die Quacksalber von Quedlinburg, Quacksalber
- Designers: Wolfgang Warsch
- Illustrators: Dennis Lohausen; Wolfgang Warsch
- Publishers: Schmidt Spiele; 999 Games; Compaya.hu - Gamer Café Kft; Devir; G3; North Star Games; CMYK
- Publication: 2018; 7 years ago
- Genres: Medieval
- Languages: German, English
- Systems: Drafting
- Players: 2–4
- Setup time: 1–5 minutes
- Playing time: 45 minutes
- Chance: High
- Age range: 10+

The Quacks of Quedlinburg (German: Die Quacksalber von Quedlinburg), also known as Quacksalber, is a board game designed by Wolfgang Warsch and first published by Schmidt Spiele in 2018. After winning the Kennerspiel des Jahres in 2018, an English version of the game was released by North Star Games.

== Concept ==
Every year the city of Quedlinburg holds a festival, where the greatest Apothecaries and "Quacksalbers" (Quack doctors) compete against each other over several days to prove that they are the greatest potion brewer of the land, with different ingredients being available for purchase in the markets each time. Every day a Fortune Teller announces what strange occurrences will affect the competing Quacksalbers that day.

== Gameplay ==
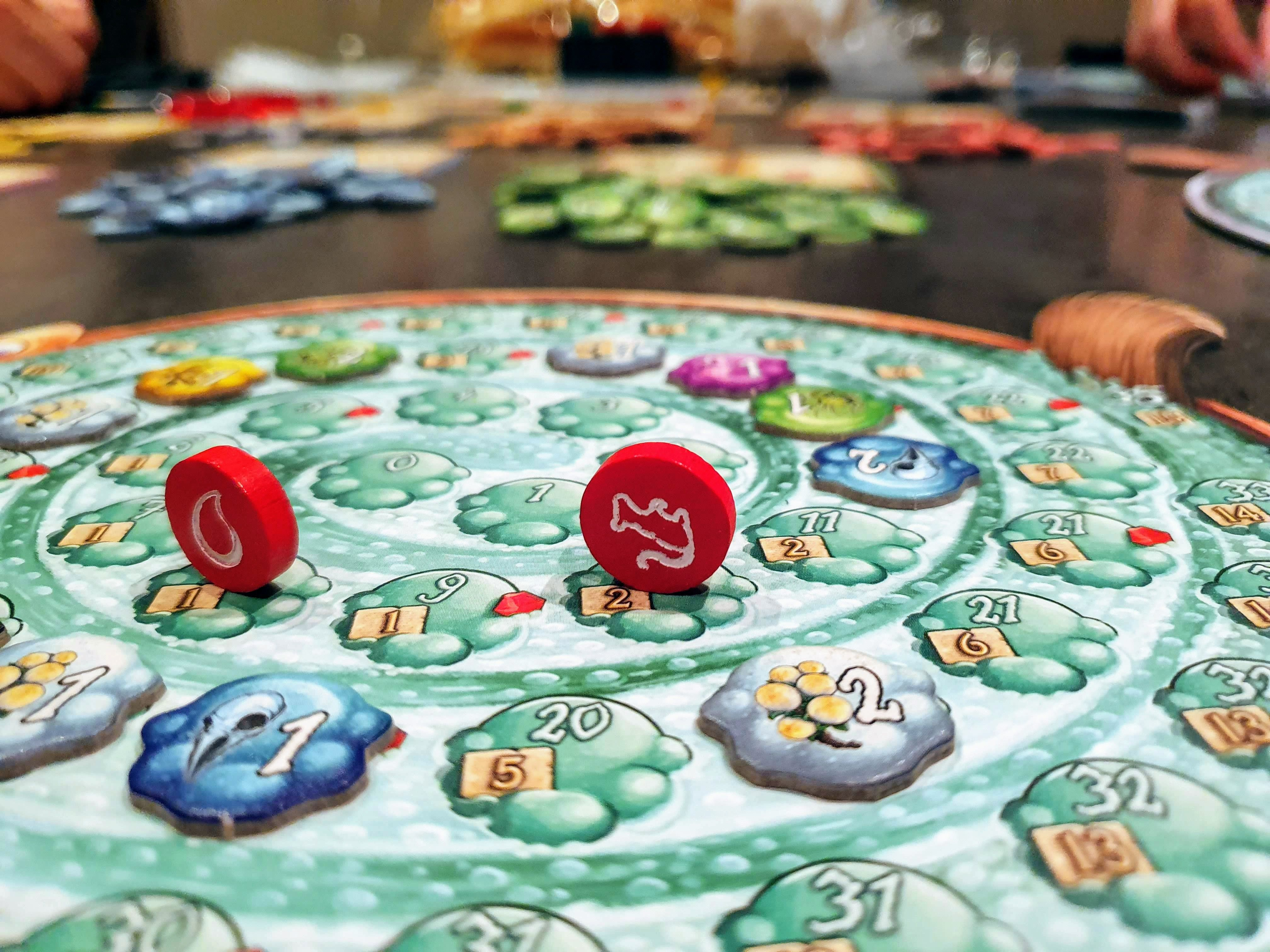
A pot player board with tokens placed along the spiral potion track

The Quacks of Quedlinburg is played using a main game board with a scoring track, individual "pot" player boards with a spiral potion track, and cloth bags for each player. It also uses coloured tokens (white, blue, green, purple, red, and yellow) that have point values from 1 to 4. Different coloured tokens have different, mainly helpful, abilities. However, in addition to one orange and one green token, each player starts the game with a number of white "cherry bomb" tokens of various point values in their bag. If the total point value of white tokens in a Quacksalber's potion exceeds 7, then the potion explodes. Each player has a flask they can use to put a drawn white token back into their bag, as long as the token wouldn't cause the potion to explode.

At the start of each round, a Fortune Teller card is drawn which specifies a special action or rule for the day. Players then draw tokens from their bags and place them on the potion track in their cauldron until they either decide to stop, or their potion explodes. The value of the tokens drawn indicate how far from the previous token it is placed on the potion track, and thus how much the potion is worth. After each round, any player whose last placed token is on a space with a jewel receives one ruby. Rubies are used to recharge their flask or advance their starting position. Coins indicated on the ending space are used to purchase more ingredients from the shop that Quacksalbers can then place in their bags and use during the next round. Victory points are awarded based on each player's distance along their potion track and are tracked using the point tracker along the edge of the main game board. Players whose potions exploded must choose to either use the shop or gain victory points, but cannot do both.

There are nine rounds and the Quacksalber with the greatest amount of victory points at the end of the game is the winner.

== Reception ==
In 2018, The Quacks of Quedlinburg was the winner of the Kennerspiel des Jahres ("connoisseur game of the year"), a Spiel des Jahres award for family games. The game also won the 2019 People's Choice Award at the UK Games Expo for Best New European Style Board Game, the 2019 American Tabletop Award for Best Casual Game, and the Origins Award for Best Family Game in 2020.

New York praised The Quacks of Quedlinburg's combination of luck and strategy, and listed the game one of the "Best Two-Player Board Games of 2022." Polygon also put the game in their list of the "22 best board games [of 2022]," with writer Charlie Theel concluding that "the push-your-luck system offers dramatic highs and constant temptation, providing for a robust family-size game that will appeal to a wide spectrum of tastes." Later, Dicebreaker listed The Quacks of Quedlinburg as one of the "Best Games of 2023," with senior writer Alex Meehan praising it for its "straightforward and addictive gameplay loop" and its ability to "[create] an atmosphere that's full of infectious tension and energy - one that's a joy to watch as much as it is to be a part of." Wirecutter also included the game in their list of the "Best Games of 2023," writer James Austin stating that it "skillfully combines that push-your-luck thrill with a surprisingly robust shopping mechanic that gives players more control over the probabilities they're playing with."

In 2022, Schmidt Spiele published a spin-off of the game designed for children, Quacks & Co.: Quedlinburg Dash.
