= Chained Echoes =

2022 video game

- Developer: Matthias Linda
- Publisher: Deck13 Spotlight
- Composer: Eddie Marianukroh
- Engine: Unity
- Platforms: Linux; macOS; Nintendo Switch; PlayStation 4; PlayStation 5; Windows; Xbox One; Xbox Series X/S
- Release: December 8, 2022
- Genre: Role-playing
- Mode: Single-player

Chained Echoes is a 2022 role-playing video game created by Matthias Linda and published by Deck13 Spotlight for Linux, macOS, Nintendo Switch, PlayStation 4, PlayStation 5, Windows, Xbox One and Xbox Series X/S. The game is inspired by classic Japanese role-playing games from the 1990s, featuring turn-based combat, 16-bit-style visuals, and a multi-character narrative. The game follows the story of unlikely heroes trying to stop war between three kingdoms. Linda was influenced by games such as Xenogears, Terranigma, Secret of Mana, Suikoden 2, Breath of Fire, The Legend of Dragoon, Chrono Trigger and Final Fantasy VI. The game has been praised by several reviewers as living up to the quality of its inspiration while offering modern advancements.

== Gameplay ==
Chained Echoes is a role-playing video game featuring pixel art visuals inspired by the 16-bit era and turn-based combat. Unlike most older role-playing games that feature random encounters, enemies are visible on the map and trigger encounters on the same screen, similar to Chrono Trigger. Battles are turn-based, and each character in the player's party has a standard attack, several special abilities, items, and a defensive stance. In combat, party members use attacks and abilities that raise the "overdrive" meter, which reaches an optimal green zone where abilities are more effective. However, the overdrive meter can overheat, and the party must discharge some of the excess by using specific abilities, such as defenses and "Ultra Moves". Unlike other role-playing games, characters in Chained Echoes do not level-up, instead leveling up skills automatically through battle, with added skill point rewards. The player controls a party of up to 8 characters. The game's estimated length is up to 30 or 40 hours.

== Plot ==
Setting and characters

Chained Echoes is set on the continent of Valandis during a multi-generational war between three kingdoms: Taryn, Gravos, and Escanya. After a great catastrophe caused by the Grand Grimoire shakes the continent, the kingdoms agree to sign a peace treaty. One year later, an unknown force strives to begin a new war, and a group of unlikely heroes join forces and eventually become the clan of Crimson Wings in order to stop it.

Valandis itself is a small continent in the much larger world of Eldrea, which has an aesthetic resembling the Middle Ages with fantasy elements such as magic, dragons, and mechs which are referred to as sky armor. Human is a blanket term for all sapient races, including anthropomorphic animals (lizards, pigs, birds, big cats, etc.), while real-life humans are called "hyoms". Another recurring element is an "Echo", a person's soul, which reincarnates into a new body and carries over some residual memories. The Grand Grimoire, which drives the main conflict of the story, is a magic crystal that, when shattered, repairs itself by absorbing all life within a thousand meters, with the exception of the person responsible for breaking it.

The Ashes of Elrant DLC takes place before the finale of the main story. The Crimson Wings are transported to a pocket dimension between Valandis and the Maelstrom, where they learn more about the events that occurred 4000 years ago.

- Glenn, sky armor pilot and the central protagonist.
- Kylian, ambitious mercenary working alongside Glenn.
- Frederik, ruler of Taryn and Lenne's brother, who is the central antagonist.
- Lenne, the princess of Taryn and Frederik's sister, who ran away from home to see more of the world.
- Robb, Lenne's childhood friend and bodyguard.
- Victor, long lived, world famous playwright who has a strong connection to Glenn and Lenne.
- Cameron, beastman friend of Victor who is formulating a method to nullify the Grand Grimoire.
- Sienna, an infamous thief known as the "red succubus" and the owner of the airship Himmelskaiser, who was a former knight of the church.
- Ba'Thraz, a reptilian mercenary with the ability to summon weapons from thin air.
- Amalia, princess of Escanya and the leader of a rebellion, who has the power of healing and is accompanied by a dog named Cres.
- Egyl, bird knight who eagerly fights for justice and honor.
- Tomke, elderly goat sailor with short-term memory loss and Mikah's honorary uncle.
- Mikah, martial artist who lost her family while searching for the ingredients to the Great Gratin.
- Magnolia, the Radiant Diva of Equilibrium, soulseer and former queen of the fairies.
- Leonar, white wolfman, the hero of Elrant and the central protagonist of the Ashes of Elrant DLC.
- Gwayn, Frederik's advisor, who has ulterior motives.
- June, Gwayn's enigmatic female partner.
- Matthye, Godfrey, Kennrich, Alena and Guston, generals of the Taryn.
- Markas, head of the Gandebrath Society, which funds the Church.
- Endarht, Markas's right-hand man and the main antagonist of the Ashes of Elrant DLC.
- Whyatt, the most powerful of the Church's inquisitors.
- Eva, an inquisitor of the church known as "the Boar of the Northern Sky."
- Raphael, an inquisitor of the Church, who comes to doubt its cause upon discovering the truth behind the organization's actions.
- The Black Sun Gang, a quartet of thieves who hold a massive grudge against Sienna.
- The Masked Man, a strange spirit that appears to those who are about to die, offering them power to save them, but with a steep price.
- The Vaen, a group of god-like beings and the ultimate antagonists of the game.
- The Harbinger, an ancient, powerful being that tried to destroy the world 4000 years ago before being sealed away inside the Maelstrom.

Story

PROLOGUE

Glenn and Kylian, alongside the Iron Bull mercenaries, attack Gravos. During the assault, Glenn unknowingly shatters the Grand Grimoire, causing a massive explosion that shakes the continent. Unwilling to take the blame for the catastrophe, the three kingdoms agree to sign a peace treaty.

ACT 1

One year later, during the anniversary celebration at Escanya, Lenne and Robb try to prevent the ambassador's assassination, Sienna is forced by the Black Sun Gang to steal riches from the castle, and Glenn and Kylian, who survived the explosion, are seeking information about the Grand Grimoire. The five eventually end up crossing paths with each other and Victor, who leads the group when a mantis-like demon hunts them down. While the group defeats the demon and escapes from Escanya, Taryn's general kills their ambassador and frames Escanya for the crime. Lenne, refusing to believe her brother was responsible, insists on traveling to Taryn to hear the truth from him.

Upon reaching Taryn, the party learns that Frederik wants to restart the war and learn from Cameron how the Grand Grimoire functions and how to destroy it. Taryn, suspecting them to be spies, arrests them. As the party tries to escape and steal the Grand Grimoire, Kylian takes Lenne hostage to use as a bargaining chip, but fails. The Grand Grimoire is set off again after being shot out of Glenn's hands.

ACT 2

Three months later, Frederik has taken full control of Valandis, with the other countries starting to openly wage war against him, and Glenn, who blames himself for the Grand Grimoire going off again, has gone into hiding. Victor finds and convinces him to join the clan of Crimson Wings, who recruit Amalia and her people before attacking Frederik and stealing the Grand Grimoire. During the assault, Lenne is killed and time stops, with three giant god-like Vaen appearing that only Glenn can see. Realizing this, the Vaen inform him they will sacrifice themselves to reverse time, allowing Glenn to save Lenne and escape with the Grand Grimoire.

ACT 3

As their "echo" awakens, Glenn and Lenne experience visions of their past lives. Glenn believes he was Timothy, who was the love interest of Lenne's previous incarnation, while Lenne is the reincarnation of the Holy Mother, whose destiny is to defeat the Harbinger. Seeking more information, the Crimson Wings travel to the Shambala and discover the church facility, which creates the majority of the world's monsters and secretly unleashes them upon the rest of the world so that fearful people will seek out their faith for salvation. Taryn forces destroy the facility while the Crimson Wings discover the Vaen, who originally helped humanity in a fight against the Harbinger. However, they went mad with power, creating the Grand Grimoire and using it to cull the human population and keep humanity under their control, in order to keep the Harbinger sealed by sending souls to the Maelstrom it is trapped in. Gwayn steals the Grand Grimoire in order to use it against them, and reveals that the key to a Vaen pocket dimension door is located in Reina's tomb.

The Crimson Wings find the key in the tomb, but are cornered by church forces. They are taken to the Marylea, the church's headquarters, where they discover that Markas is trying to summon the Harbinger by draining the Maelstrom of souls and allowing it to break free. Kylian, who had joined the church, steals the Grand Grimoire and delivers it to Frederik in exchange for power. Taryn conducts a full-scale assault on Marylea, but the Crimson Wings escape. Glenn realizes he was not Timothy, but Van, an arrogant nobleman who murdered Timothy and Lenne in the past. Horrified by this revelation, Glenn falls into a coma.

ACT 4

The Crimson Wings seek help from Magnolia, who sends them into Glenn`s mind. There, they discover his other previous incarnation was Bartholomew, the most brilliant mind of the Nhysa Academy of Magic. He instructed a young Victor to help Bartholomew make amends for his past life as Van by taking care of Lenne's reincarnation when she returned. The Crimson Wings defeat the "Chained Echo", a manifestation of Glenn's guilt and self-loathing, restoring him to normal.

The Crimson Wings confront Frederik, who commits suicide since his ultimate plan was to rally the rest of the world against him in order to establish true world peace. Gwayn provokes the Vaen into summoning their giant champion to destroy Valandis. The Crimson Wings use the Grand Grimoire to destroy the champion, absorbing its life energy and making the Grand Grimoire strong enough to kill the Vaen.

The Crimson Wings travel to the Nhysa Academy of Magic, where the door to the Vaen pocket dimension is located. Gwayn reveals himself to be Lebrodia-Dervinas, the "True King" and guardian of the world's life. Kylian, who Gwayn had converted as a back-up plan in case Glenn failed, kills Gwayn and absorbs his powers. He tries to fight the Vaen, but they overpower and possess him. The Crimson Wings use the Grand Grimoire, which weakens the Vaen and allows them to be killed. The Grand Grimoire, which had no life energy to absorb in order to repair itself, is destroyed. Glenn, tired of the original burden he had been carrying for multiple lifetimes, redeems himself by giving Kylian his power before dying. The game ends with Lenne crowned as queen and seeking a weapon that can kill the Harbinger, while Glenn reincarnates as a bird.

ASHES OF ELRANT

Set before the ending of the main story, a group of researchers studying a strange rift that has appeared in Valandis request help from the Crimson Wings in dealing with the interfering Taryn military. Upon dealing with them, the rift grows and sucks the Crimson Wings in.

The Crimson Wings find themselves in a region which Lenne, her "echo" reacting, recognizes as the lost continent of Elrant, which was destroyed by the Harbinger 4000 years ago and she ruled as queen in her previous life. Initially, the Crimson Wings believe they have traveled through time. However, upon encountering Leonar, the hero of Elrant, he reveals they are inside a physical space on the edge of the Maelstrom where time does not flow. Leonar leads the people to guard the cage where the Harbinger lies dormant.

One of the researchers reveals himself to be Endarht, whose plan was to make the rift large enough to bring in a giant mana machine which would drain the Maelstrom from souls in order to free the Harbinger. While the Crimson Wings, alongside Leonar and his followers, manage to destroy the mana machine, the seal has been weakened to the point that the Harbinger will be free in less than 40 years. Despite this, Leonar remains optimistic they will be ready for the Harbinger's return.

== Development ==
The game was made by the German developer Matthias Linda, who grew up making fan games with RPG Maker. His favorite games included Xenogears, Terranigma, Secret of Mana, Suikoden 2, Breath of Fire, The Legend of Dragoon and Final Fantasy VI, which influenced his development of Chained Echoes. He was mindful not to copy them, instead trying to capture his experience of playing them, which he remembers as "in my head, all these games look and play better than they actually did." Linda cited the Dragon Quest series as an influence on the towns and their non-player character inhabitants.

The game's development nearly took 7 years, beginning in 2016 after a year of considering the story concept. The game had a successful Kickstarter campaign in 2019 and the digital edition was published by Deck13 in 2022. The physical edition was supposed to be released by First Press Games. However, by March 2026, 13 products, including special editions for PlayStation 4, Nintendo Switch, and PC, as well as a CD soundtrack, had yet to be released. Linda announced he would be pursuing legal action against FPG.

The music was developed over 4 years by Eddie Marianukroh and includes 50 tracks at 2 hours in length.

The DLC Ashes of Elrant was released on August 7, 2025, which added a new playable character, new areas, over 40 new enemies and bosses, over 15 new music tracks, mini-games, new items and equipment.

== Reception ==
Reception

Aggregate score
Aggregator	Score
Metacritic	PC: 92/100; NS: 90/100; PS4: 87/100; XBSX: 91/100

Review scores
Publication	Score
Game Informer	8.75/10
HobbyConsolas	89/100
Nintendo Life	9/10
RPGamer	4.5/5
RPGFan	90/100
Screen Rant	5/5

The PC and Switch versions of Chained Echoes have received "universal acclaim", while the PlayStation 4 version has received "generally favorable" reviews on Metacritic.

Rock Paper Shotgun said that "Chained Echoes has taken all the right lessons from its 16-bit inspirations... [feeling] modern and nostalgic at the same time". Siliconera praised the game because "[t]he 16-bit art feels right for the style of the game, everyone in the large cast of characters feels distinct, the story is engaging, and the battle system feels familiar and unique at the same time." Nintendo Life called it one of the best role-playing games of the year and "a wonderful mash-up of '90s JRPG tropes, masterfully woven together to produce an experience that feels simultaneously nostalgic and fresh". Windows Central spoke positively about the combat system and story, saying that "for those players with ingrained nostalgia for classic SNES JRPGs, Chained Echoes is an absolute must have title". Digitally Downloaded said that the game would reach the quality of the best classic Japanese role-playing games since "Chained Echoes not only meets that standard, but if it was released back on the SNES when Final Fantasy IV, V, and VI were flying high, people would have considered them comparable." Screen Rant called the game "a must-play", because it is "a fresh, smart adventure that celebrates classic JRPGs while not being afraid to push into new directions".
