= Quacks & Co.: Quedlinburg Dash =

Board game

- Other names: Quacks & Co.; Mit Quacks & Co. nach Quedlinburg
- Designers: Wolfgang Warsch
- Illustrators: Michael Menzel
- Publishers: Schmidt Spiele; 999 Games; Compaya.hu - Gamer Café Kft; CMYK
- Publication: 2022; 4 years ago
- Genres: Children's game; Racing game
- Players: 2–4
- Playing time: 25 minutes
- Age range: 6+

Quacks & Co.: Quedlinburg Dash, also known as Quacks & Co., is a German children's racing game designed by Wolfgang Warsch and first published by Schmidt Spiele in 2022. It is a spin-off of the game The Quacks of Quedlinburg. Players take turns drawing coloured chips from a bag in order to move their animal along a racetrack and be the first to make it to Quedlinburg.

== Gameplay ==
Quacks & Co. is played using a game board with a short race track on one side and a long racetrack on the other. Each player begins the game with an animal token (donkey, sheep, pig, or cow) at the start of the track and the corresponding animal card, as well as a cloth feeding bag with an identical set of chips. A set of action cards are placed in the centre of the play area so they are visible to all players.

On a player's turn, they randomly draw a chip–which can be either a food chip (red, yellow, green, blue, and white) or a black "dream weed" chip–from their bag and "feed" it to their animal. If a player draws a food chip, they move their animal token the number of spaces listed on the chip and take the action on the corresponding action card; some of the food tokens allows the player take a ruby piece from the ruby reserve, which acts as currency in the game. If a player draws a dream weed chip, their turn is skipped and the piece is placed in one of the three dream clouds on their animal card. Once the player has drawn three dream weed chips, they can use any of their collected rubies to purchase new food chips with all different colours. All the player's previously drawn chips, including newly purchased ones, go back into their bag and any unspent rubies are returned to the ruby reserve.

Once a player's animal token reaches the end of the race track and thus arrives in Quedlinburg, they are declared the winner and receive the golden cauldron token.

=== Variations ===
Quacks & Co. includes many options for variation. The action cards have two sides corresponding to different variations: an easier side marked with a caterpillar and a harder side marked with a butterfly. Additionally, two more coloured food tokens (orange and purple) can also be included and the game board has a different racetrack on each side.

== Reception ==
Quacks & Co. was the winner of the 2022 Deutscher Kinderspiele Preis, a Deutscher Spiele Preis award for Best Children's Game. At the 2022 UK Games Expo, the game was the winner of both the Judge's Award and the People's Choice Award for Best Children's Game. It was nominated for the 2022 Kinderspiele des Jahres. In an article discussing the nominees, Spielbox wrote that "Mit Quacks & Co. impressed with its easy entry, its easily comprehensible story, and many variations."

In a review by Keith Law for Paste, he noted that in the game "nothing bad can really happen," and concluded that "It’s a good reimagining for younger players of a brilliant game, but the earlier game is also simple enough that I think kids who love Quacks & Co. will be ready for the full experience pretty quickly." James Palmer, writing for Smithsonian, listed it as one of the best board games of 2022.
