= Flamecraft =

Worker placement game

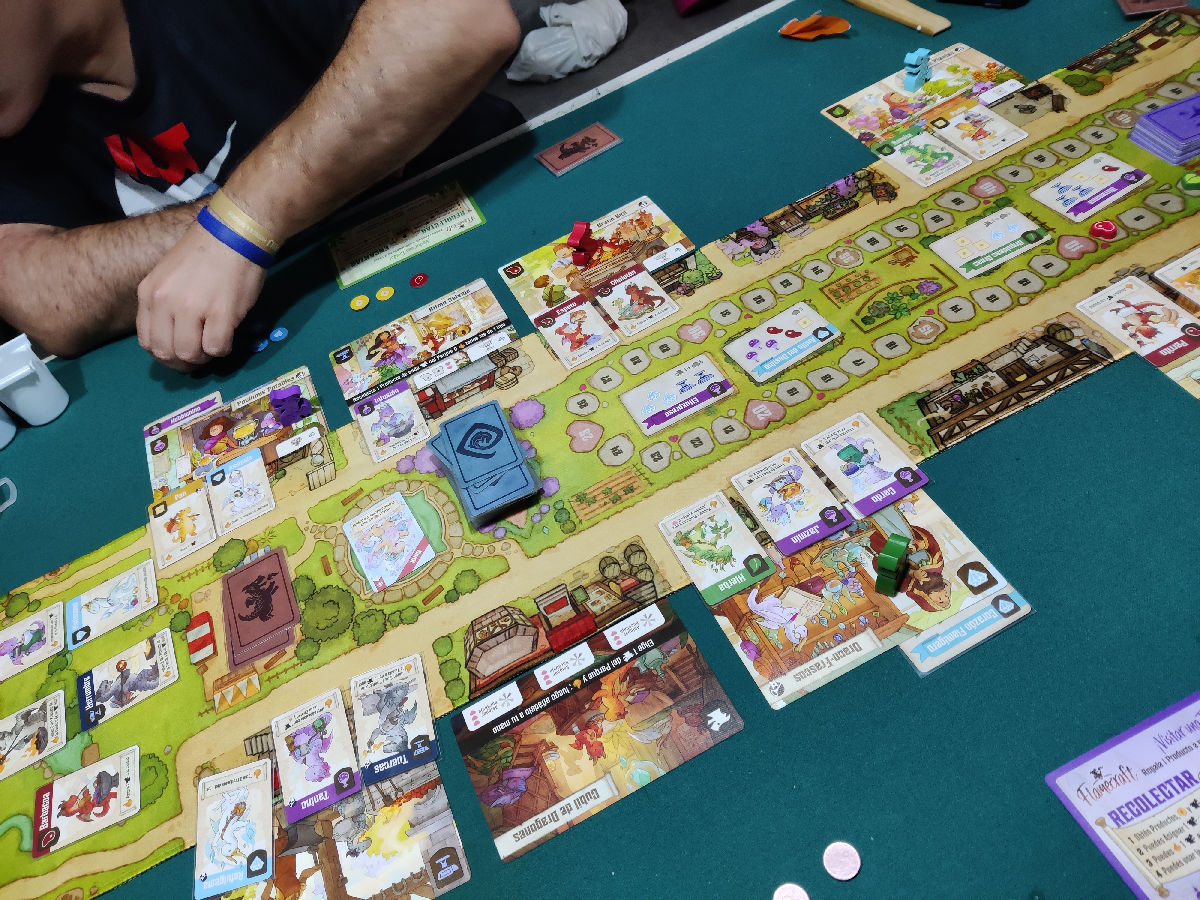
- Designers: Manny Vega
- Illustrators: Sandara Tang
- Publishers: Cardboard Alchemy; Gameology; Lucky Duck Games
- Publication: 2022; 4 years ago
- Genres: Worker placement game
- Players: 1–5
- Playing time: 90 minutes
- Age range: 10+

Flamecraft is a card game designed by Manny Vega and published in 2022 by Cardboard Alchemy, featuring illustrations by Sandara Tang. Players act as "Flamekeepers", assisting shops in town with dragons and enchantments in order to have the best reputation by the end of the game.

== Publishing history ==
Flamecraft was funded by a successful Kickstarter and early copies were released to backers in mid-2022. The game was published for retail later that year. Flamecraft Duals, a two-player abstract matching game set in the same world as Flamecraft, was released in January 2026.

A video game adaptation developed by Monster Couch was announced to be in production in early 2025, and a demo was released on Steam in June 2026.

== Gameplay ==
Flamecraft is played with a Town mat which acts as a game board, three decks of cards (Artisan Dragons, Enchantments, and Shops), and cardboard tokens for Goods and Coins. To start, six Starter Shops and their corresponding Starter Artisan Dragon cards, as well as the top five cards from both the Artisan Dragon and Enchantment decks, are placed face-up on the Town mat. Each player begins the game with three Artisan Dragon cards, which list the dragon's type and the ability used when the dragon is "fired up". They also start with one card from the Fancy Dragon deck, which have different goals to be completed for various amounts of Reputation. Fancy Dragon cards are either Sun Dragon cards, which can be cashed in on a player's turn, or Moon Dragon cards, which are only scored at the end of the game.

On their turn, a player must visit a shop different from their previous turn and then either Gather there or Enchant it. If they decide to Gather, the player gains Goods, Coins, and Dragons from the Shop based on its number of Dragons and Enchantments. They may then choose to place an Artisan Dragon card from their hand into one of the Shop's Dragon slots with a matching icon to gain the listed reward. This action also allows the player to fire up a dragon, and use the Shop's special ability. If they decide to Enchant, the player pays the Goods cost of one of the face-up Enchantment cards matching one of the Shop's icons to gain its listed rewards once, and from then on that Shop gives one additional Good when any player Gathers there. The player can then choose to fire up all dragons. If an Artisan Dragon card is placed in the last empty slot of a Shop during a player's turn, a new Shop from the Shop deck is placed on the Town mat.

At the end of their turn, a player must return cards from their hand so they have less than six Artisan Dragons cards and seven Goods of each type, and redraw any missing face-up Artisan Dragon or Enchantment cards. When there are no more cards in one of the Artisan Dragon or Enchantment decks, one more round is played and Reputation is awarded for leftover Coins and completed Moon Dragon goals. The player with the most Reputation at the end of the game is the winner.

== Reception ==
Freelance contributor James Palmer, writing for Smithsonian, listed it as one of the best board games of 2022, praising the game's art style and noting that the game is suitable for little kids but still engaging for older children. IGN rated Flamecraft 8/10, with Matt Thrower noting that "balance of simple rules and evolving depth as the game progresses gives Flamecraft a very wide appeal" but that "it can feel repetitive and shallow after a few plays." Charlie Hall, writing for Polygon, described the game as "an absolute joy from start to finish," and praised it heavily for both its visual and game design.

Flamecraft was the winner of Dicebreaker's 2022 Tabletop Award for Best Board Game, with Matt Jarvis describing the game as "a delight through and through" and commending its illustrations and balance of strategy and simplicity. The game was nominated for the 2023 Expert Game Prize (Dutch: Kennersprijs) of the Nederlandse Spellenprijs and was the winner of the 2023 Prettiest Game (Polish: Najładniejsza Gra) award of the Gra Roku.
