= 2022 in esports =

List of esports events in 2022 (also known as professional gaming).

== Calendar of events ==
=== Tournaments ===
Date	Game	Event	Location	Winner(s)
February 8 – 20	Rainbow Six Siege	Six Invitational 2022	Stockholm, Sweden	TSM
February 17 – 27	Counter-Strike: Global Offensive	IEM Katowice 2022	Katowice, Poland	FaZe Clan
March 9 – April 10	Counter-Strike: Global Offensive	ESL Pro League Season 15	Düsseldorf, Germany	FaZe Clan
April 10 – 24	Valorant	2022 Valorant Champions Tour: Stage 1 Masters	Reykjavík, Iceland	OpTic Gaming
May 14 – 22	Counter-Strike: Global Offensive	PGL Major Antwerp 2022	Antwerp, Belgium	FaZe Clan
June 16 – 19	PUBG: Battlegrounds	PUBG Nations Cup 2022	Bangkok, Thailand	United Kingdom
July 7 – 17	Counter-Strike: Global Offensive	IEM Cologne 2022	Cologne, Germany	FaZe Clan
July 10 – 24	Valorant	2022 Valorant Champions Tour: Stage 2 Masters	Copenhagen, Denmark	FunPlus Phoenix
July 14 – 17	FIFA	2022 FIFAe World Cup	Copenhagen, Denmark	Umut Gültekin (Umut)
July 20 – 23	FIFA	2022 FIFAe Club World Cup	Copenhagen, Denmark	Riders
July 27 – 30	FIFA	2022 FIFAe Nations Cup	Copenhagen, Denmark	Brazil
August 5 – 7	various fighting games	Evo 2022	Las Vegas, United States	
August 31 – October 2	Counter-Strike: Global Offensive	ESL Pro League Season 16	Naxxar, Malta	Team Vitality
August 31 – September 18	Valorant	2022 Valorant Champions	Istanbul, Turkey	LOUD
September 23 – 25	Clash Royale	Clash Royale League 2022 World Finals	Helsinki, Finland	Mohamed Light
October 20 - 23	Halo Infinite	Halo World Championship 2022	Seattle, Washington	OpTic Gaming
October 15 – 30	Dota 2	The International 2022	Singapore	Tundra Esports
November 1 – 20	PUBG: Battlegrounds	PUBG Global Championship 2022	Dubai, UAE	Natus Vincere
November 5 – 13	Counter-Strike: Global Offensive	IEM Rio 2022	Rio de Janeiro, Brazil	Outsiders
December 14 – 18	Counter-Strike: Global Offensive	BLAST Premier World Final 2022	Abu Dhabi, UAE	G2 Esports

=== Professional league seasons ===
Country	Game	League	Venue	Champion	Runner-up	Result	Playoff format
Philippines	Mobile Legends: Bang Bang	MPL Philippines Season 9	SMX Convention Center Manila	RSG Philippines	Smart Omega	4–1	Best-of-7 series
Philippines	Mobile Legends: Bang Bang	MPL Philippines Season 10	The Blue Leaf Cosmopolitan	Blacklist International	ECHO Philippines	4–2	Best-of-7 series
