= Ayaneo 2 =

Handheld gaming computer by Ayaneo

- Developer: Ayaneo
- Type: Handheld gaming computer
- Released: December 2022
- Introductory price: Ayaneo 2 from US$1,099; Geek from US$949
- Operating system: Windows 11
- System on a chip: AMD Ryzen 7 6800U
- Memory: 16 GB / 32 GB LPDDR5 6400Mhz
- Storage: 512 GB - 2TB NVMe SSD
- Display: Ayaneo 2: 7-inch, 1200p, IPS; Geek: 1200p, 800p
- Graphics: AMD Radeon RX 680M, 2200 MHz, 3.379 TFLOPS
- Connectivity: USB-C; Bluetooth 5.2; Wi-Fi 6
- Power: 50.25 Wh Lithium-ion battery 13050 mAh
- Dimensions: Ayaneo 2; Width: 264.5 mm (10.41 in); Height: 105.5 mm (4.15 in); Depth: 21.5 mm (0.85 in); Geek; Width: 264.5 mm (10.41 in); Height: 105.5 mm (4.15 in); Depth: 22.3 mm (0.88 in)
- Weight: 680 g
- Website: Official website

The Ayaneo 2 is a handheld gaming computer developed by Ayaneo and released in December 2022. The console uses a Zen 3 processor. It can play PC games on the Windows 11 operating system. It competes against Valve's Steam Deck and Asus ROG Ally.

== Ayaneo Geek ==
An Ayaneo Geek version was launched simultaneously with the Ayaneo 2. Ayaneo Geek differs from Ayaneo 2 by not having motion sensors in both the body and handles, a higher-quality vibration motor, touch-to-wake support for the fingerprint sensor, or a PCIe 4.0 SSD by default, and is less expensive than the Ayaneo 2.

== See also ==
- Steam Deck
- Asus ROG Ally
