= Women are Werewolves =

Tabletop role-playing game

- Designers: C.A.S. Taylor and Yeonsoo Julian Kim
- Illustrators: Amber Lewis
- Publishers: 9th Level Games
- Publication: 2022
- Genres: tabletop role-playing game, fantasy
- Players: 1-6
- Age range: 13+

Women are Werewolves is a fantasy tabletop role-playing game by Yeonsoo Julian Kim and C.A.S. Taylor about nonbinary characters in a family where only the women transform into werewolves beneath the full moon. It was published in 2022 by 9th Level Games after a successful Kickstarter campaign raised $23,556. Women are Werewolves won "Game of the Year" at Dicebreaker's 2023 Tabletop Awards and the first annual Nonbinary Tabletop Awards in 2024.

== Gameplay ==
A custom Tarot deck of story prompts guides gameplay.

== Reception ==
Women are Werewolves won "Game of the Year" at Dicebreaker's 2023 Tabletop Awards and the Nonbinary Tabletop Awards in 2024. Linda Codega for Gizmodo named Women are Werewolves one of the 20 best roleplaying games of 2022. Matt Jarvis for Dicebreaker wrote that "Insightful as it is accessible, Women are Werewolves combines the familiar folklore of werewolves with its cathartic and meaningful gameplay, for both Queer and non-Queer players alike." Chase Carter for Dicebreaker wrote that, "this approachable title uses tarot cards to serve players prompts that explore relationships to gendered spaces and family customs."
