= Captivade =

Board game released in 2022

Box Cover of Captivade

Captivade is a British pursuit-evasion and deductive themed board game for 2-4 players. It was released in 2022 by Mewstone Games.

The name is a portmanteau of "capture" and "evade", the two objectives of the players.

== Background theme ==
In Captivade, each player controls a prisoner who has just escaped from Pentonville Prison, London. These prisoners are:

- Ruby Red - a socialite who has a taste for the finer things in life. She is awaiting extradition to China after being jailed for her role in a series of casino heists
- Gary Green - a fixer from East London. He was jailed for arson and GBH after burning down a rival snooker club
- Beatrice Bleu - an eco-warrior who was raised in France and graduated from St Andrews University. She was jailed after being accused of masterminding the destruction of gas extraction sites in the North Sea
- Yousef Yellow - a delivery driver from Birmingham. He was jailed for trading exotic animal furs

Players also each control an MI6 agent, tasked with capturing the escapees and returning them to Pentonville. However, each agent sympathises with one of the escapees and will not turn them in. These agents are:

- Agent Brown - who sympathises with Ruby Red
- Agent White - who sympathises with Gary Green
- Agent Black - who sympathises with Beatrice Bleu
- Agent Silver - who sympathises with Yousef Yellow

== Gameplay ==
Captivade is played on a board displaying a map of the world, with 92 city locations highlighted. All escapee and agent pawns start in London, however the escapee pawns are not physically placed on the game board. Instead, players track the location of their pawns on (included) set pieces of paper as they move throughout the game. Other players must then use their agents to track down the other escapees, with the player being caught last winning the game.

The game is played over 6-10 rounds, stylised as 'weeks' within the game. Each week consists of three phases:

- Run - At the start of each week, each player can move their escapee up to two city connections (four in Week 1). Players can also use their limited funds to take flights between cities with an airport symbol
- Roll - Once all escapees have moved, each player must roll a dedicated dice to determine what events occur during the current week. This often includes an escapee being spotted at a previous location, forcing the player to give certain information about their whereabouts. The dice roll may also cause the player to draw an event card. These cards can have effects for all players, such as an airport closing or cities becoming impassable
- Chase - Players can now move their allocated agents and attempt to capture the escapees using information gathered throughout the game. Agents may move up to three connections, searching the last two locations they move to. If an escapee is discovered, they are captured and returned to Pentonville Prison. Captured players may still control their agent to find other players. If a player moves their agent to a location containing their escapee, the agent provides them with money rather than capturing them

Once the set number of weeks has passed, the players who have successfully evaded capture win the game.
