= Ayaneo =

Brand of handheld gaming computers

Anyun Intelligent Technology (Hong Kong) Co., Limited
- Native name: 岸沄智能科技（香港）有限公司
- Romanized name: An Yun Zhineng Keji (Xianggang) Youxian Gongsi
- Founded: 2020
- Founders: Arthur Zhang
- Headquarters: Eton Tower, Hysan Ave, Causeway Bay, Hong Kong, China
- Area served: Worldwide
- Products: Handheld gaming computers Mini PCs; Accessories
- Website: ayaneo.com

Ayaneo (variously stylized as AYANEO, AyaNeo or Aya Neo) is a Chinese brand of handheld gaming computers and mini PCs.

== History ==
Ayaneo was founded in March 2020 by Arthur Zhang (尾巴大叔), a tech entrepreneur and gaming enthusiast. Prior to founding Ayaneo, Zhang had established Digital Tail (2010) and New Mobility (2015), ventures that focused on digital lifestyle and electric vehicles, respectively. Zhang assembled a team to develop a Windows-based handheld console designed specifically for gamers.

Ayaneo has relied on crowdfunding platforms, like Indiegogo, to launch and fund its devices.

== Devices ==
=== Aya Neo (2021) ===
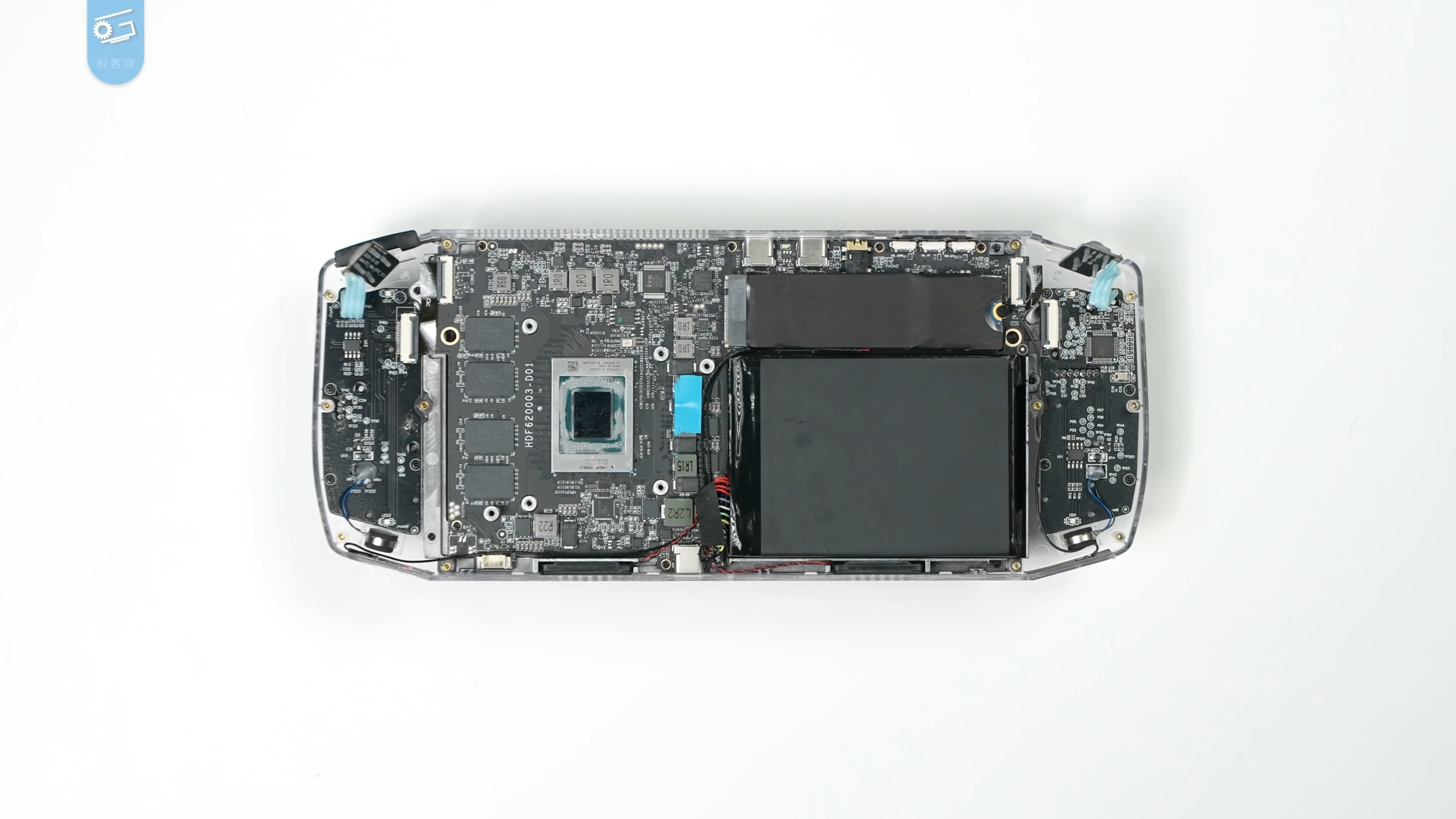
Interior of an Aya Neo

The Aya Neo was the first model of handheld gaming computer sold under the Ayaneo brand, and originally financed through crowdfunding. It used a Ryzen 5 4500U processor, 16 GB RAM, 512GB or 1TB SSD storage, and a 7'' 1280×800 pixel touchscreen.

Reviewers described its performance as acceptable for less demanding games, and the device as a whole as a relatively expensive and novel type of device for a "niche crowd" of handheld PC gamers.

=== Ayaneo Air / Ayaneo Air Pro (2022) ===
The Air device uses Microsoft's Windows 11 operating system, a Ryzen 5 5560U processor, 8 or 16 GB RAM, a 5.5'' 1080p OLED screen and 128GB or 512GB SSD storage, expandable via an SD card. The Pro variant has some improved specifications.

Eurogamer wrote that the Ayaneo Air provides lower graphics performance than its main competitor, the Steam Deck, due to the Air's older GPU architecture. According to IGN, the Air provides acceptable performance with modern games at a lower 720p resolution, but not at the screen's native resolution. But the reviewers praised the Air for its better screen, portability and compatibility with Windows games compared to the Steam Deck, the latter owing to the Air being a native Windows device, as opposed to the Linux Proton compatibility layer used by the Steam Deck.

=== Ayaneo Next / Ayaneo Next Pro (2022) ===
The Next is a larger and more powerful device compared to the Air, using a Ryzen 7 5800U processor, 16 GB RAM, a 7'' 1280×800 pixel touchscreen and 2TB SSD storage.

IGN described it as an "impressive" handheld gaming PC, capable of playing modern games at high frame rates, but noted a number of "quirks and challenges" such as controller glitches.

=== Ayaneo 2 (2022) ===
The Ayaneo 2 uses an AMD Ryzen 7 6800U Zen 3 processor.

=== Ayaneo Geek (2022) ===
Ayaneo Geek was launched together with Ayaneo 2. Differently than Ayaneo 2, Ayaneo Geek will not have motion sensors in both the body and handles, a higher-quality vibration motor, touch-to-wake support for the fingerprint sensor, and a PCIe 4.0 SSD by default.

=== 2023 models ===
In 2023, five new models were launched: Ayaneo Pocket Air, Ayaneo Kun, Ayaneo Air 1s, Ayaneo 2s and Ayaneo Geek 1s. All devices use new AMD Ryzen 7840U processor and Windows 11, except Ayaneo Pocket Air which uses MediaTek Dimensity 1200 (only around 30% of 7840U performance) with Android.

== Windows 11 handhelds ==
Name	Ayaneo	Ayaneo Next	Ayaneo Next Pro	Ayaneo 2 / Geek
Release date	July 2021	May 2022	Sept 2022	Dec 2022
Launch price	US$699	US$1 099	US$1 665	US$1 099
Display	7″ 1280×800 IPS 60 Hz	7″ 1280×800 IPS 60 Hz		7″ 1920×1200 IPS 120 Hz
Processor	Ryzen 5 4500U	Ryzen 7 5800U		Ryzen 7 6800U
Graphics	Radeon Vega 6	Radeon Vega 8		Radeon RX 680M
Memory	16 GB LPDDR4x	16–32 GB LPDDR4x		16–32 GB LPDDR5‑6400
Storage	512 GB–1 TB SSD	1–2 TB SSD		512 GB–2 TB NVMe SSD
Input controls	ABXY + sticks + triggers + D-pad + gyro	Adds hall sticks, RGB, fingerprint (Pro)		Hall sticks, triggers, paddles
Battery	47 Wh	50.25 Wh		
Connectivity	Wi‑Fi 6, BT 5.2, USB‑C, 3.5 mm	Adds USB4 (dual), Micro‑SD		
Weight	650 g	~720 g		680 g
Dimensions	255×106×20 mm	262×112×30 mm		264.5×105.5×21.5 mm
Operating system	Windows 10/11	Windows 11		
Colors available	Black, White	Dark Gray, Light Blue		Starry Black, B.Duck Yellow

Name	Ayaneo Air	Ayaneo Air Pro	Ayaneo Air 1S	Ayaneo 2S / Geek 1S
Release date	May 2022	Sept 2022	July 2023	May 2023
Launch price	From US$549	From US$699	—	~US$700–800
Display	5.5″ 1080p OLED			7″ 1920×1200 IPS 60 Hz
Processor	Ryzen 5 5560U	Ryzen 7 5825U	Ryzen 7 7840U	Ryzen 7 7840U
Graphics	Radeon integrated / 780M			Radeon 780M
Memory	8–16 GB LPDDR4x	16 GB LPDDR4x	16–32 GB LPDDR5	Up to 64 GB LPDDR5x
Storage	128–512 GB SSD	512 GB–1 TB SSD	512 GB–2 TB SSD	
Input controls	Standard Neo layout		Hall sticks, paddles, gyro	
Battery	28 Wh	38 Wh	~38 Wh	50.25 Wh
Interfaces	USB 3.2 Gen 1, 3.5mm headphone jack, Nano-SIM and Micro SD card slot			USB 4, Micro‑SD
Connectivity	WiFi 6, BT 5.2			
Weight	450 g			~667 g
Dimensions	224×89.5×26.7mm			264.5×105.5×21.5 mm
Operating system	Windows 11			
Colors available	Aurora White, Polar Black	Aurora White, Bright Silver	Aurora White, Starry Black	Starry Black, Sky Blue

Name	Ayaneo Flip DS	Ayaneo Slide	Ayaneo KUN	Ayaneo 3
Release date			Sep 2023	Apr 2025
Launch price			—	From US$699
Display			8.4" 1600P IPS	7″ 1080p 144 Hz HDR OLED or 120 Hz IPS
Processor			Ryzen 7 8840U / 7840 U	Ryzen 7 7840U / Ryzen AI 9 HX 370
Graphics			Radeon 780M	Radeon 780M / 890M
Memory			16–64 GB LPDDR5x	16–64 GB LPDDR5x
Storage			512 GB–4 TB PCIe 4.0 SSD	512 GB–2 TB PCIe 4.0 SSD
Input controls			Hall sticks, paddles, gyro, touchscreen, touchpad	Modular hall sticks, touchpads, paddles, trigger locks
Battery			75 Wh	49 Wh
Interfaces			USB4 Type-C×2, USB-A 3.2 Gen2, 3.5mm headphone jack, UHS-II TF card slot	USB 4, OCuLink, Micro‑SD
Connectivity			WiFi 6E, BT 5.2, 4G-LTE	Wi‑Fi 6E, BT 5.3
Weight			950 g / 960g (4G edition)	690 g
Dimensions			312.4×132.5×21.9 mm	289.8×115×22.4 mm
Operating system	Windows 11			
Colors available			Black feather, Silver wing, White silk	Midnight Black, Sunset Orange, Starry Sky Gray

== Android handhelds ==
Name	Ayaneo Pocket Micro	Ayaneo Pocket S	Ayaneo Pocket AIR	Ayaneo Pocket EVO	Ayaneo Pocket S2	Ayaneo Pocket ACE
Release date	~Jan 2025 Indiegogo	2024	2024	Late 2024	Mar 2025	Mar 2025 announcement
Launch price	US$191 (Indiegogo)	~$399+	—	Crowdfunding from US$389–639	TBD (likely ~$400–500)	—
Display	3.5″ 960×640 IPS	6″ 1080p / 1440p IPS	5.5″ 1080p AMOLED	7″ 1080p OLED 165 Hz HDR	6.3″ 1440p IPS	4.5″ 1620×1080 LCD
Processor	Helio G99	Snapdragon G3x Gen 2	Dimensity 1200	Snapdragon G3x Gen 2	Next-gen Qualcomm flagship	Snapdragon G3x Gen 2
Graphics	Mali-G57	Adreno integrated	Mali-G77 MC9-class (Snapdragon integrated GPU)	Next-gen Adreno	Next-gen Adreno	Integrated Adreno
Memory	8 GB LPDDR4X	Up to 16 GB	8 GB	8–24 GB	Up to 16 GB?	—
Storage	256 GB UFS 2.2 (up to 1 TB)	Up to 1 TB	256 GB	128 GB–2 TB	—	—
Input controls	Hall sticks, shoulder, gyro	Hall sticks, vibration, sticks, triggers	Hall sticks, linear triggers, gyro	Hall sticks with RGB, linear triggers, gyro, vibration modes	Improved sticks, vibration & controls	Compact layout, linear motor
Battery	2,600 mAh (~10 Wh)	—	7,350 mAh (~28 Wh)	8,600 mAh	Larger than Pocket S	6,000 mAh
Connectivity	Wi‑Fi 5, BT 5.2, USB‑C	Wi‑Fi 6, BT 5.2, USB‑C	Wi‑Fi 6, BT 5.3, USB‑C	Wi‑Fi 6E, BT 5.3, USB‑C	Wi‑Fi 6E, BT 5.3, USB‑C	Wi‑Fi 6, BT 5.3, USB‑C
Weight	230 g	326 g	320 g	620 g	TBD	TBD
Dimensions	155×71×21 mm	162×70×19 mm	161×68×18 mm	275×113×21 mm	TBD	TBD
Operating system	Android 11 + Windows 11 (dual boot)	Android 13 + Windows 11 (dual boot)	Android 12 + Windows 11 (dual boot)	Android 13 + Windows 11 (dual boot)		

== Mini PCs ==
Name	AYANEO Retro Mini PC AM01	AYANEO Retro Mini PC AM02
Release date	Nov 2023	Jan 2024
Launch price	From US$149	From US$529
Processor	AMD Ryzen 3 3200U / 5700U	AMD Ryzen 7 7840HS
Graphics	Radeon Vega 3 / 8	Radeon 780M
Memory	8 GB LPDDR4X	Up to 64 GB DDR5
Storage	256 GB SSD (up to 1 TB)	512 GB–8 TB SSD
Display	3.5″ 960×640 IPS	4″ touchscreen
Cooling	Passive	Active (45W turbo fan)
Connectivity	Wi-Fi 5, BT 5.2, USB-C	Wi-Fi 6E, BT 5.2, USB4, DP 1.4, HDMI 2.0, USB-A
Weight	233 g	478 g
Dimensions	Compact	261×100×17 mm
Operating system	Windows 11 Home	
Colors available	White, Purple	White, Silver
