= Tegra Note 7 =

Mini tablet computer by Nvidia

- Developer: Nvidia
- Manufacturer: EVGA (US), ADVENT (UK), Gigabyte (AU, NZ, TW), Homecare Technology and Colorfly (China), Xolo (India), Gradiente (Brazil), HP (HP Slate 7 Extreme), Cherry Mobile (Philippines)
- Type: Mini tablet computer
- Released: 19 November 2013; 12 years ago
- Introductory price: US$199 £stg.129
- Operating system: Android 4.2 (Jelly Bean) (Upgradable to Android 5.1 Lollipop through OTA updates by NVIDIA)
- System on a chip: Nvidia Tegra 4
- CPU: 1.8 GHz quad-core ARM Cortex-A15
- Memory: 1 GB DDR3L-1600 (12.8 GB/s)
- Storage: 16 GB internal eMMC, microSD card reader
- Display: 7 inches (18 cm) 1280 × 800 px (216 ppi) IPS LCD
- Graphics: 72 GeForce graphics cores (24 vertex shaders + 48 pixel shaders)
- Sound: Front stereo speakers with NVIDIA PureAudio
- Input: 10-point multi-touch capacitive DirectTouch screen, front microphone, 9-axis accelerometer, gyroscope, compass, ambient light sensor, GPS
- Camera: Front: VGA 0.3 MP, 480p Rear: HDR 5 MP, Autofocus 1080p HD
- Connectivity: 2.4 GHz Wi-Fi (802.11 b/g/n), Bluetooth 4.0 LE, micro USB 2.0, micro HDMI, 3.5mm audio jack
- Power: 4100 mAh (15.17 W·h)
- Dimensions: 4.68 inches (11.9 cm) (w); 7.83 inches (19.9 cm) (h); 0.37 inches (9.4 mm) (d)
- Weight: 0.7 pounds (320 g)
- Related: Shield Tablet, Shield Portable
- Website: http://www.evga.com/Products/Product.aspx?pn=016-TN-0701-B1

The Tegra Note 7 is a mini tablet computer and the second Tegra 4 based mobile device designed by Nvidia that runs the Android operating system.

== Release ==
The tablet was revealed on September 18, 2013. EVGA was the first to partner with Nvidia for release on November 19, 2013. Other manufacturers Nvidia has partnered with include Advent, ZOTAC, PNY, Gigabyte, Xolo, HP and Cherry Mobile.

The device is known as EVGA Tegra Note 7 in the US, Advent Vega Tegra Note 7 in the United Kingdom, Gradiente Tegra Note 7 in Brazil, Gazer Tegra Note 7 in Ukraine and Russia, Gigabyte Tegra Note 7 in Australia and New Zealand, Cherry Mobile Tegra Note 7 in the Philippines and XOLO PLAY Tegra Note 7 in India. HP has rebranded the Tegra Note 7 as the HP Slate 7 Extreme.

== Features ==
The Note 7 uses a 1.8 GHz quad-core Tegra 4 chipset with 1 GB of RAM; Nvidia claims that the chipset and other improvements make it the fastest 7-inch tablet on the market offering 50% faster browsing experience than tablets twice the price. Notable features of the device include enhanced capacitive "DirectStylus" technology that is three times more responsive, premium Tegra 4 audio processing with PureAudio, and world's first HDR camera in a tablet with Nvidia Chimera computational photography. The 1280×800 display use Nvidia PRISM 2 display processing, which modulates the display backlight and per-pixel color values to extend battery life 40% for up to 10 hours of HD video playback.

== Software updates ==
Nvidia released Tegra Note 7 System Update 3.0 (Android 5.1) on July 23, 2015.

== See also ==
- Comparison of tablet computers
- Nvidia Shield
- Nexus 7 (2012 version)
