= Nvidia Shield Tablet =

Gaming tablet by Nvidia

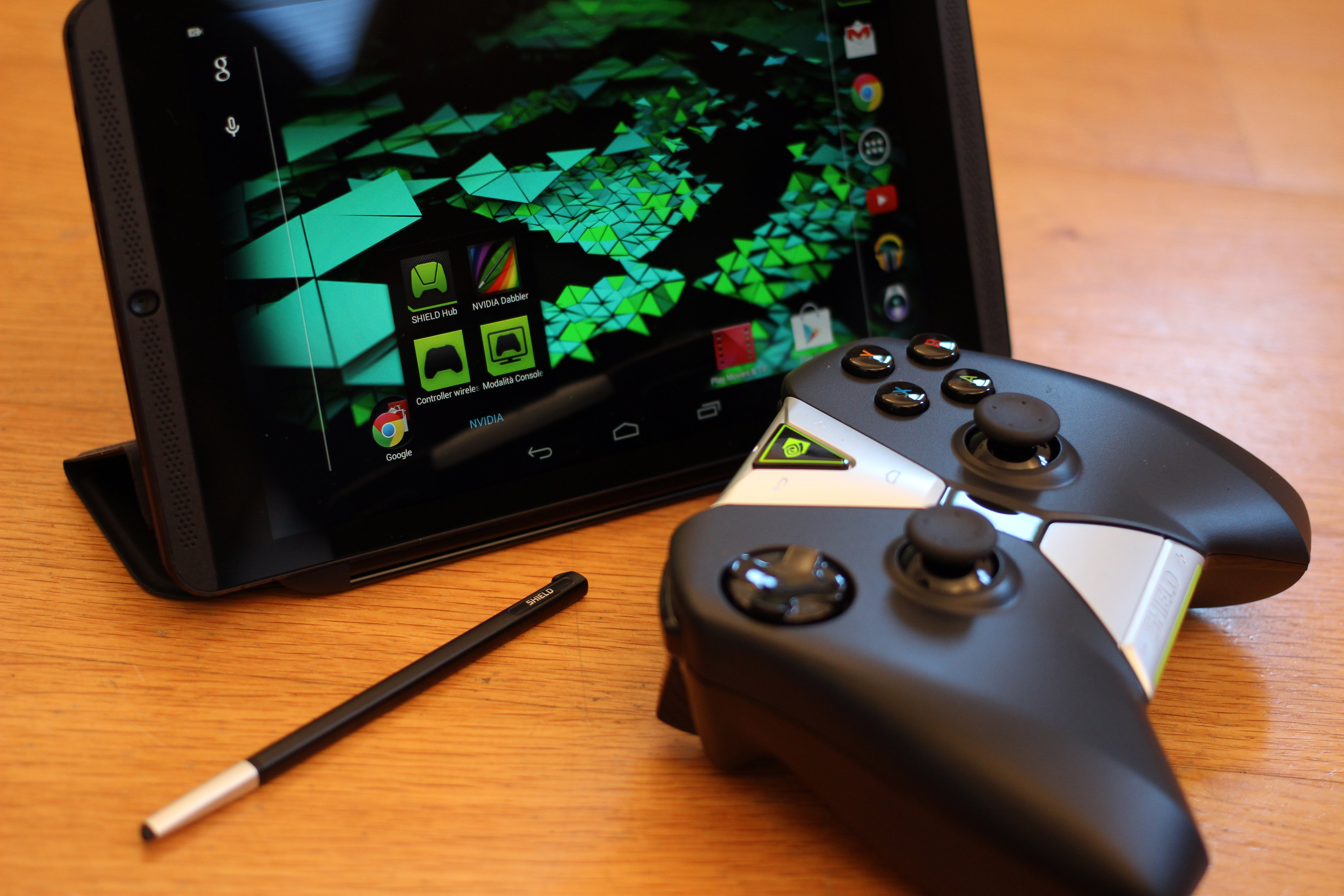
- Shield Tablet with the Shield Controller and DirectStylus
- Also known as: Shield Tablet K1 (relaunch)
- Manufacturer: Nvidia
- Product family: Shield
- Type: Gaming tablet
- Released: July 29, 2014 (USA/CAN); August 14, 2014(EU)
- Lifespan: 2014–2018
- Introductory price: US$299 (16 GB WiFi Only)/US$399 (32 GB + 4G LTE)/US$199 Shield K1 (16 GB WiFi Only)
- Discontinued: 2018
- Operating system: Android 4.4.2 "KitKat"; Upgradable to Android 7.0 "Nougat"
- System on a chip: Tegra K1
- CPU: 4 × Cortex-A15 R3 2.2 GHz
- Memory: 2 GB DDR3L
- Storage: 16–32 GB flash memory, Up to 200 GB microSDXC card reader
- Display: 8 inches (20 cm) 1920 × 1200 px(283 ppi) IPS Retinal LCD
- Graphics: GK20A (Kepler) (192:8:4)
- Input: Multi-touch capacitive screen, microphone, 3-axis accelerometer, gyroscope, GPS
- Controller input: Optional Shield Controllers, up to 4
- Camera: Front: 5 MP HDR; Back: 5 MP auto-focus HDR
- Connectivity: 2×2 MIMO 2.4 GHz + 5 GHz Wi-Fi 802.11n, Bluetooth 4.0, micro USB 2.0, mini HDMI, 3.5mm audio jack
- Power: 5197 mAh (19.75 W·h)
- Online services: Nvidia TegraZone; Google Play; GeForce Now
- Dimensions: 5.0 inches (13 cm) (w); 8.8 inches (22 cm) (h); 0.36 inches (9.1 mm) (d)
- Weight: 390 g (13.76 oz), 356 g (12.56 oz) (Shield K1)
- Related: Shield Portable, Tegra Note 7
- Website: shield.nvidia.com/gaming-tablet/

The Shield Tablet, later relaunched as the Shield Tablet K1, is a gaming tablet, developed by Nvidia and released on July 29, 2014. It was Nvidia's second portable gaming device that uses Android. Compared to the Shield Portable, the controller is not permanently connected to the screen; it can be purchased separately. Up to four controllers can be wirelessly connected at the same time. While the Shield tablet features an 8-inch 1920×1200 pixel display, it can output 4K resolution signal to a television via HDMI.

In November 2015, the tablet was refreshed and renamed as the Shield Tablet K1 and the price was reduced to $200.

In August 2016, Nvidia announced it had cancelled plans to release a hardware upgrade to its Shield Tablet products - a speculated reason for the cancellation was product conflict with the Nintendo Switch, which uses similar technology. In mid-2017 the tablet was no longer available for sale on Nvidia's website or any of the other websites in which the tablet was being sold. NVIDIA officially announced in mid-2018 that the tablet had been discontinued on the Shield website.

== Features ==
The Shield Tablet is powered by an Nvidia Tegra K1 SoC and has stereo front-facing speakers. There's a 16 GB WiFi-only model and a 32 GB LTE model. It has front- and back-facing 5-megapixel HDR cameras. It weighs 390 grams and is 221 mm × 126 mm × 9.2 mm in size. The 2015 Shield K1 refresh weighs 356 grams while preserving the other dimensions of the tablet.

== Software updates ==
=== Shield Tablet ===
Nvidia released Shield Tablet OTA 2.0 update with Android 5.0 Lollipop on November 18, 2014. The Shield Tablet OTA 2.1 update with Android 5.0.1 Lollipop & OpenGL 4.5 support was released on December 23, 2014. Shield Tablet OTA 3.1 update with Android 5.1.1 was released on July 30, 2015. Shield Tablet OTA update with Android 6.0 Marshmallow was released on February 1, 2016.

Shield Tablet OTA 4.1 update with Android 6.0.1 Marshmallow was released on May 12, 2016, OTA 4.2 update on July 12, 2016, OTA 4.3 update on October 10, 2016, & OTA update on November 3, 2016.

Nvidia released Shield Tablet OTA 5.0 update with Android 7.0 Nougat on February 9, 2017.

=== Shield Tablet K1 ===
Nvidia released Shield Tablet K1 OTA 1.0 update with Android 6.0 Marshmallow on December 21, 2015 and the Shield Tablet K1 OTA 1.1 on February 1, 2016.

Nvidia released Shield Tablet K1 OTA 1.2 update with Android 6.0.1 Marshmallow & Vulkan support on April 13, 2016, OTA 1.3 update on June 15, 2016, OTA 1.4 update on September 13, 2016 & OTA 1.5 update on November 3, 2016.

NVIDIA released the Shield Tablet K1 OTA 5.0 update with Android 7.0 Nougat on February 9, 2017.

== Connectivity ==
- Headphone Jack
- Micro USB
- Mini HDMI 1.4a
- Slot for the stylus that makes use of Nvidia's GPU DirectStylus 2 (on original model)
- Micro-SD card slot

== Wireless ==
- 802.11n 2x2 MIMO 2.4 GHz and 5 GHz Wi-Fi
- Bluetooth 4.0 LE
- GPS / GLONASS
- SIM card slot in the 32 GB LTE model with LTE, HSPA+, 3G, 2G, GSM and EDGE connection.

== Issues ==
On July 31, 2015, Nvidia issued a recall to replace Shield Tablet devices sold between July 2014 and July 2015 due to overheating issues that posed a fire hazard.

The Shield Tablet K1 supports DirectStylus 2 (sold separately). However, this requires the user to upgrade to system update 1.2. This update provides integration of its unique software features (e.g., palm rejection, NVIDIA Lasso) into Android.

== Reception ==
Android Central's Andrew Martonik likes the Shield Tablet, praising its speakers and the Twitch streaming ability. The downsides are that the tablet is heavier than its competitor (390 g to the Nexus 7's 290 g) and it may be too expensive for some (the tablet is $299 to $399, the controller is $59, and the cover is $39). The Shield Tablet K1, released in late 2015, comes without a charger or stylus.

== See also ==
- Nvidia Shield
- Shield Portable
- GeForce NOW
- Eighth generation of video game consoles
- Asus ROG Ally
- Lenovo Legion Go
- MSI Claw A1M
- Nintendo Switch
- Steam Deck
