= Nvidia Shield Portable =

Handheld game console by Nvidia

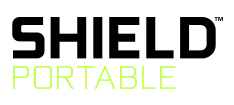

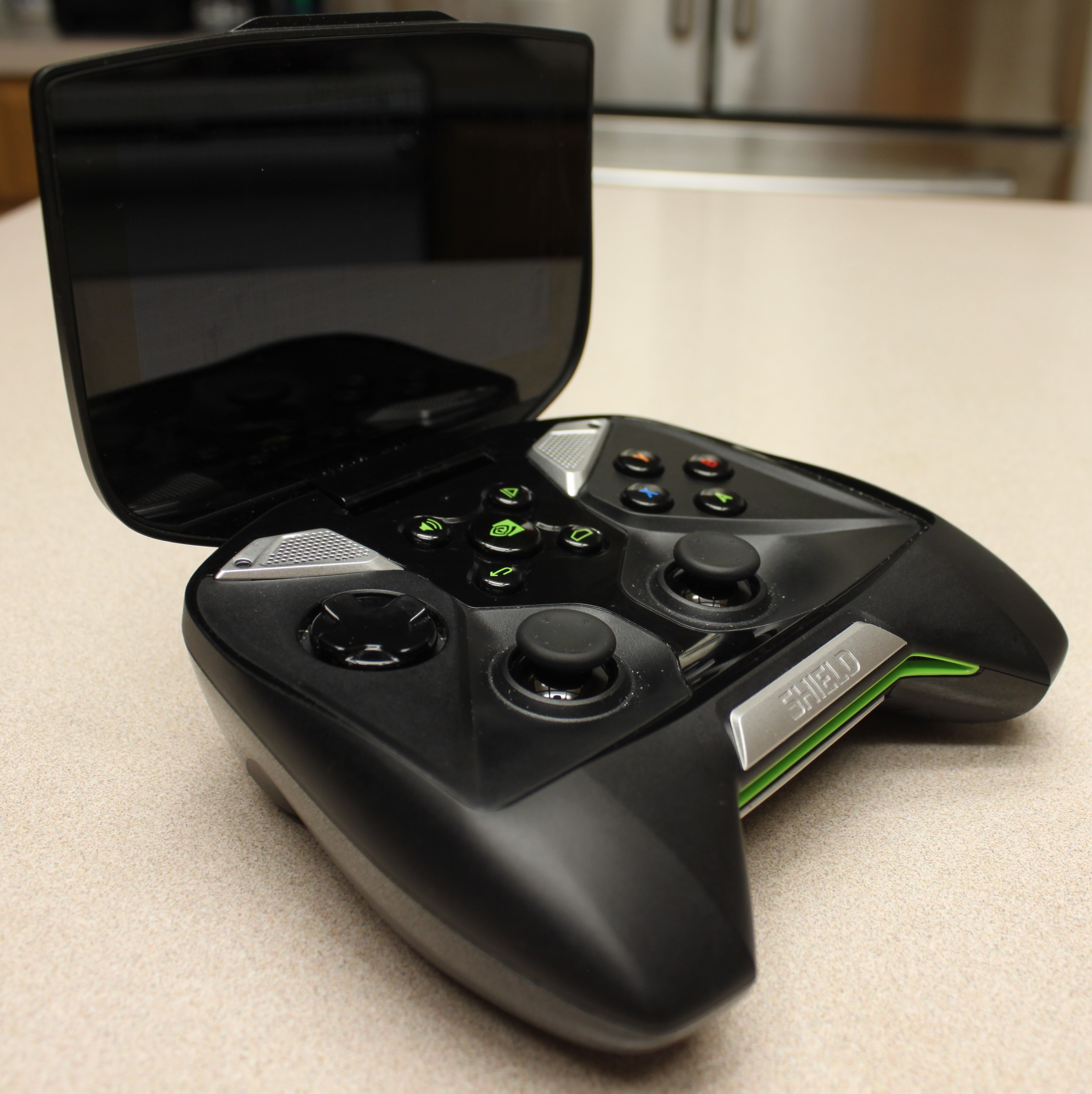
- Also known as: Nvidia Shield; NSP (abbreviations)
- Manufacturer: Nvidia
- Product family: Shield
- Type: Handheld game console
- Released: July 31, 2013; 13 years ago
- Introductory price: US$299
- Operating system: Android 4.2.1 (Jelly Bean) (upgradable to Android 5.1 Lollipop)
- System on a chip: Tegra 4
- CPU: 1.9 GHz GHz quad-core ARM Cortex-A15
- Memory: 2 GB DDR3L RAM
- Storage: 16 GB flash memory, microSD card reader
- Display: 5 inches (13 cm) 1280 x 720 px(294 ppi) IPS LCD
- Graphics: 72 GeForce graphics cores (24 vertex shaders + 48 pixel shaders)
- Input: Multi-touch capacitive screen, microphone, 3-axis accelerometer, gyroscope, GPS
- Controller input: D-pad; 2 × Analog Sticks; L/R bumper and trigger buttons X, Y, A, B buttons NVIDIA/Power Button; Start button Home button Volume buttons Back button
- Connectivity: 2×2 MIMO 2.4 GHz + 5 GHz Wi-Fi 802.11n, Bluetooth 3.0, micro USB 2.0, mini HDMI, 3.5mm audio jack
- Power: 7350 mAh (28.8 W·h)
- Online services: Nvidia TegraZone; Google Play; GeForce Now
- Dimensions: 6.22 inches (15.8 cm) (W); 2.244 inches (5.70 cm) (H); 5.315 inches (135.0 mm) (D)
- Weight: 579 g (20.42 oz)
- Related: Shield Tablet, Tegra Note 7
- Website: www.nvidia.com/en-us/shield/

The Nvidia Shield Portable (Nvidia Shield or NSP) is a handheld game console developed by Nvidia, released on July 31, 2013. It runs on Android Lollipop 5.1, featuring a flip 130mm (5-inch) touchscreen display with 1280×720 resolution. It is similar in shape to an Xbox 360 controller and similar in control setup to a DualShock controller, with two analog joysticks, a D-pad, and other buttons. It is the first device to use Nvidia's Tegra 4 processor. It was originally called Shield or Nvidia Shield, but since the launch of the Shield Tablet, it is called the Shield Portable.

Due to being out of stock for many years, it is presumably discontinued, but there has not yet been any official announcement from Nvidia. An update in 2022 removed the GameStream feature from all Shield devices including the portable models.

== Features ==
Through Nvidia's GameStream suite, Shield Portable allows the streaming of games running on a desktop PC equipped with a GeForce GTX 650 or higher video card (formerly known as GeForce PC Streaming). The Android 4.4.2 update for Shield Portable adds Console Mode, which allows a Shield Portable to be connected to a TV at either 720p, 1080p or 4K resolution (either using a wireless connection or MicroHDMI) and controlled with a Bluetooth controller, and software for mapping on-screen control buttons to the device's hardware buttons for Android games which do not natively support them.

Alongside the exclusive games available through Nvidia's own TegraZone market and GeForce Now game-streaming service, Shield Portable can also access the Google Play store, as with most other Android-based devices.

== Software updates ==
Nvidia released SHIELD Portable Software Upgrade 103 on July 23, 2015, which added Android 5.1, Chromecast support to connect to a TV and removed some games that do not work with Android 5.1. Miracast support was also removed.

Nvidia released SHIELD Portable Software Upgrade 106 on September 3, 2015.

Nvidia released SHIELD Portable Software Upgrade 110 on July 6, 2016.

== Critical reception ==
Nvidia Shield Portable has received mixed reception from critics. Generally, reviewers praised the performance of the device, but criticized the cost and lack of worthwhile games. IGN's Scott Lowe rated the Shield Portable a 6.8/10, noting the "impractical cost and a scarcity of compelling games". Engadget's review noted the system's "extremely impressive PC gaming", but also that due to its high price, the device was "a hard sell as a portable game console", especially when compared to similar handhelds on the market. CNET's Eric Franklin states in his review of the device that "The Nvidia Shield is an extremely well made device, with performance that pretty much obliterates any mobile product before it; but like most new console launches, there is currently a lack of available games worth your time." Eurogamer's comprehensive review of the device provides a detailed account of the device and its features; concluded by saying: "In the here and now, the first-gen Shield Portable is a gloriously niche, luxury product - the most powerful Android system on the market by a clear stretch and possessing a unique link to PC gaming that's seriously impressive in beta form, and can only get better."

== See also ==
- Asus ROG Ally
- Ayaneo
- Lenovo Legion Go
- MSI Claw A1M
- Nintendo Switch
- Nintendo Switch 2
- Razer Edge
- Shield Tablet
  - Tegra Note 7
- Shield TV
- Steam Deck
