= FunOrb =

Online game website

- FunOrb logo
- Website type: Internet games
- Available in: English, French, German, Brazilian Portuguese
- Owner: Jagex
- Website: www.funorb.com
- Commercial: Yes
- Registration: Optional (compulsory for multi-player games)
- Launched: 27 February 2008; 18 years ago
- Current status: Closed on 7 August 2018; 8 years ago

FunOrb was a casual gaming site created by Jagex. Launched on 27 February 2008, and closed on 7 August 2018, it was the company's first major release after their successful MMORPG, RuneScape. All of the games were programmed in Java.

Jagex had announced that this site was targeted towards the "hard casual", "deep casual" or "time-pressured" gamer market and that it intended to expand into the mobile phone games market. On 3 December 2009, Jagex released its first mobile phone game, Bouncedown, for the iPhone and iPod Touch, followed by StarCannon on 15 April 2010, Miner Disturbance on 8 June 2010, and Undercroft on 16 September 2010.

== Summary ==
A screenshot showing Arcanists, one of the games on FunOrb.

FunOrb offered single-player and multiplayer games. Multiplayer games allowed players to communicate with each other through a public lobby, game chat, which could be used while playing in a game, or through private chat, which could be used to talk to people on RuneScape, and vice versa. In all released multiplayer games, players received a separate rating for each game, which symbolised their experience with the games and could rise or fall based on their rated game performance. In all released multiplayer games, with the exception of the persistent-world game, Dungeon Assault, players could play "rated" games, which found random opponents and adjusted their rating based on their performance, or they could play unrated games with people of their choice, which had no effect on their rating.

The site included an achievement system which gave awards for completing challenges in single-player and multiplayer games. These included "Orb Coins", which players were able to spend on a variety of game content including desktop wallpapers, music, icons, and more. Also awarded were "Orb Points", which could be compared to those of other players. The site was launched in English, German, French and Brazilian Portuguese.

Jagex stated that FunOrb would be updated every two weeks, either with a new game, an update to a game or an updated site feature, but the last website update was on 2 December 2014. Jagex stated in 2008 that they were considering adding third party games to the site, but at the time of the site closing only Jagex created games were ever released.

== Cost ==
Another screenshot showing the game Armies of Gielinor.

Limited versions of all FunOrb games were available for free, with costs covered by advertising. Some games were completely free, with the exception of fullscreen mode. Players had the option of becoming paying subscribers, which gave them access to more ingame content, among other things the option to play games in fullscreen mode and an increased number of achievements. Subscribers were also granted immediate access to the FunOrb forums, whereas non-subscribers were required to have obtained at least 42 achievements before being allowed to post.

== Holiday events ==
From 22 October 2008 to 5 November 2008, special Halloween Achievements were spread across 10 games, with each of those games having a temporary Halloween theme. These were re-released on 28 October 2009, along with Achievements and Halloween themes for several other games.

On 18 December 2008, an update for the game Arcanists was released in celebration of Christmas, in the form of several costumes that players could buy with Orb Coins.

== Shutdown ==
On 9 May 2018 Jagex announced that FunOrb would be closed down on 7 August, stating that "advancements in software and hardware have made it increasingly difficult to access and play the games on the portal, and that’s ultimately led to our decision." On the same day, Jagex Moderator "Mod Meadows" started taking applications for free three-month FunOrb memberships as "a great way to say 'goodbye'". Applications were taken until May 11 with memberships being sent out the following week. While the shutdown announcement had said "we’ll be keeping the servers online until 7th of August 2018", the servers were not immediately shut off as they still remained online throughout the morning as each game was slowly shut down.

== Awards and accomplishments ==
In November 2011 the FunOrb game Arcanists won game of the month on MPOGD.
