= Legacy of Blood (disambiguation) =

Legacy of Blood is a 2004 album by Jedi Mind Tricks.

Legacy of Blood may also refer to:

- Legacy of Blood, a 1971 horror film written and directed by Carl Monson
- Legacy of Blood, a 1978 horror film written and directed by Andy Milligan
- Bangladesh: A Legacy of Blood, a 1986 book by Anthony Mascarenhas
- Legacy of Blood (module), a 1987 accessory for the Dungeons & Dragons role-playing game
- Legacy of Blood (novel), (2001) the first novel based on the video game Diablo
- RuneScape: Legacy of Blood, (2012) the third in the series of RuneScape novels
- Legacy of Blood, a 2016 album released by Argentinean folkmetal band Skiltron.
