= 8Realms =

- Developer: Jagex
- Publisher: Jagex
- Platform: Browser
- Release: Closed Beta; 5 May 2011
- Genre: MMORTS
- Mode: Multiplayer

8realms was a browser based empire-building massively multiplayer online real-time strategy game developed by Jagex. It is the company's first internally developed MMORTS, and second published MMORTS, after War of Legends.

== History ==
The 8Realms closed beta was released on 5 May 2011 as Jagex's first HTML-based game. Players were given advanced access to the closed beta by invitation through e-mail and through the game's Facebook page.

=== Shutdown ===
Jagex shut down 8Realms 1 July 2012, having met only 10% of their sales target for the game. Jagex CEO Mark Gerhard released a closure statement on the 8Realms website as follows:

"We have decided to withdraw 8Realms from the market on the 1st of July for a number of reasons, chief amongst those was to focus sharply on our three priorities for this year namely continuing to grow RuneScape, developing a great Transformers MMO and the launch of another game that is currently a closely guarded secret.

I know that this news will be disappointing to many of you and I want to express my sincere thanks to everyone who has taken part in the 8Realms beta. We have really valued your feedback and strong support and to show our appreciation we will be gifting everyone that has previously bought Gems with double the amount in WoL-cash!

Whilst there is clearly still time for you to finish your current journey through the ages one final time, I would like to take this opportunity to introduce another tactical strategy game in the Jagex portfolio. If you enjoyed 8Realms then I think you'll probably love War of Legends, a strategy game based on ancient mythology where players take the role of a Feudal Lord in charge of a kingdom. Players go on to build mighty empires, manage resources, and build armies to conquer their enemies, similar like in 8Realms.

We are in the process of allowing players to transfer their account to War of Legends and will have this completed before the 1st July when 8Realms will go offline. More details of how this will work to be announced shortly. Once again thank you sincerely for your support, we hope to see you all in War of Legends soon."

== Gameplay ==
A screen-shot of an endgame settlement

The game focus on three aspects: Control, Wealth and Knowledge.

There are 8 ages in 8Realms: Ancient, Classical, Feudal, Renaissance, Imperial, Industrial, Modern and Future (though Future was unreachable in the closed beta). The objective of the game is to compete with other players in civilization advancement, as the game advertised as from caveman to spaceman, which is reminiscent of Sid Meier's Civilization.

Players may advance to the next age upon reaching 100% culture and by building a wonder. Culture can be gained by completing various tasks assigned by the game; or gained over time by capturing various luxuries found scattered throughout the map or by idle population after the Louvre has been built. Task are capped at 4 task per day in the beta and the first generation, but not in the second generation of the VIP games.

Resources in 8realms may become obsolete and replaced with another resource, but will not exceed more than 5 resources including gold. Resources are required and serve as a limiting factor for building and researching to progress through the ages, which can be gathered by internal production from settlements or acquired from occupied tiles multiplied by custom houses.

Military in 8realms requires minimal resource to build, but have a considerable upkeep on resources. Military is divided into 6 general types: Melee, Ranged, Mounted, Artillery, Vehicle and Air. Each has a unique attributes and different attack priorities - for instance, Artillery units have the highest attack priority and Air units can ignore terrain. Military power is used for conquering resource or luxury tiles and will play a vital role in the end game race.

Unique to the browser based online strategy genre; once a winner is declared, the contest is officially ended and everyone will have to start over in the next round (server).

=== Game Interface ===
The original game had 3 tabs.

The first tab switches between the overworld and your settlements. In the overworld, the user can view and interact with settlements and garrisons of other empires, as well as barbarian-held tiles which can contain resources or luxuries. In settlements, the user may build or upgrade buildings, which divides into control (military buildings), wealth (resource buildings) and knowledge (support buildings) on allocated tiles that may increase by age. The next tab is the task tab, which displays ongoing tasks that need to be done. The last tab is the empire tab, which gives tables of resource income, lists of army garrisons and ability to toggle tax.

In the first generation of the VIP game engine, an additional social tab is added which gives a summary of statistics on cultural, civic and military progress. A "store" interface is also added for users to buy micro-transactions and gain various in-game bonus.

In the second generation of the VIP game, the social tab is replaced with a leaderboard, allowing the user to compare with their in-game friends.

=== Endgame (closed beta) ===
Once a player reached 100% culture of the last age (Modern in the closed beta), the endgame phase would trigger, which was called The Race of Glory. Players had to defend their final wonder, the Cold Fusion Reactor, for 24 hours against the rest of the server; including other players who are also building their final wonders. Success was depended not only on raw military power, but diplomacy and politics is also essential to gather allies and manipulate enemies to fight each other. Once the final wonder was completed, then it would be Game Over for other players on the server with the message,

Time and tide wait for no man - and time has run out for you. Over seven arduous Ages, you have grown a humble settlement into a fine and proud empire. With the completion of a wonder to get into the future age, the hour has come for your empire to join so many others in the annals of history.

Closed Beta servers
Date	Server name	Winning empire	Winning player
13 July 2011	Genghis Khan	Footpire	Shy Ally
13 July 2011	Julius	The Indecisive	Indy Cision
14 September 2011	Augustus	Snneah Chomh	Ryan P J
25 September 2011	Alexander	They	Osirdedbdbzb
1 December 2011	Napoleon	No winner: server ended early	

=== Endgame (VIP) ===
In the VIP version, The Race of Glory fight would still occur, similar to the BETA game, but the end game would only be triggered at 100% of the Future age. The final wonder has also been changed into the nanotechnology.

However the major difference is that once the final wonder was completed, apocalypse begins with self-aware nanobots taking over the world. The remaining player can choose between building "the Ark" starship to escape or allow the nanobots to assimilate their emperies. The winner, the escaped and the assimilated will unlock the legend, the augmented and the damned units respectively for the next round. After the game is completed, the player can review their ranking and compare statistics with other players who have participated in that round.

VIP servers
Date	Server name	Winning empire	Winning player
25 February 2012	Boudica	Auldrant	Ryan P J
4 March 2012	Cleopatra	Funland	BlueStori
4 April 2012	Constantine	Call Sign	ChenW2 Tim
22 May 2012	Lincoln	Syvlrw	Syvlrw
21 April 2012	Montgomery	Zord	DonnySC
7 May 2012	Spartacus	Threads of Time	Wolves425
2 June 2012	Wallace	Oudaaarns	Oudaaarns

== Awards and accomplishments ==
In March 2012 8Realms won game of the month on MPOGD.
