= Full-service radio =

Type of radio format

Full-service radio is a type of radio format characterized by a mix of music programming and a large amount of locally-produced and hyperlocal programming, such as news and discussion focusing on local issues, news, sports coverage, interviews, call-in segments, and sometimes religious content. The aim of full service radio is to provide a one-stop shop for listening needs and serve a wider demographic. Music played may be a variety or catered to a certain demographic, usually by local DJs. Full service radio saw a decline after television became widespread in the 1950s.

== See also ==
- Tradio
