= Pay-to-play =

Exchange of money for the privilege to engage in a specific activity

Pay-to-play (P2P), sometimes called pay-for-play, is a situation in which money is exchanged for services or the privilege to engage in certain activities. The common denominator of all forms of pay-to-play is that one must pay to "get in the game", with the sports analogy frequently arising.

== Terminology ==
The term "pay-to-play"' in the political context refers to a practice where individuals or entities, often through campaign donations or financial contributions, gain access or influence over government officials and decision-making processes (Smith, 2020). This term is used to describe a perceived link between political contributions and political favors or access (Jones, 2019). While it is a widely used term in discussions about campaign finance and political corruption, it doesn't have a single origin or a specific creator. (Brown, 2017).

=== Origin and usage ===
The concept of "pay-to-play" has been present in political discourse for many years (Johnson, 2005). However, it gained significant prominence in the United States during the 20th century, particularly in the context of campaign finance regulations and political fundraising practices (Smith, 2020). The specific phrase "pay-to-play" is believed to have emerged organically within political and media discussions, reflecting the idea that political access and influence could be bought through financial contributions (Davis, 2013).

Prominence and Usage: The term "pay-to-play" is most commonly used in discussions about campaign finance, lobbying, and political corruption (Smith, 2020). It gained prominence in the late 20th and early 21st centuries as concerns grew about the increasing influence of money in politics (Brown, 2017).

=== Effects on people ===
"Pay-to-play" practices can have various effects on the political system and the general populace:

- Undermining Equal Representation: It can create a perception that those with financial resources have greater access to policymakers, potentially undermining the principle of equal representation. (Jones, 2019).
- Policy Influence: There are concerns that large political contributions can lead to policies that favor the interests of wealthy donors over the broader public. (Davis, 2013).
- Erosion of Trust: It may erode public trust in government, as people believe elected officials are more responsive to donors than to constituents. (Johnson, 2005).
- Barriers to Participation: It can discourage individuals without financial means from engaging in the political process, potentially limiting diversity in political leadership. (Smith, 2020). These effects highlight the complex and contentious nature of "pay-to-play" dynamics in politics, with implications for democratic principles and governance.

== In the entertainment industry ==
=== Broadcasting ===
The term also refers to a growing trend in which individuals or groups may purchase radio or television airtime, much like infomercials, to broadcast content promoting the payer's interests. While these types of shows are typically shows that have little sponsor support and have no substantiated audience, some major program producers do purchase airtime to "clear" their programs in certain major markets. This type of format is particularly common among religious broadcasters (televangelism), where the related term pay-for-pray is used.

=== Music industry ===
The term also refers to a growing trend, where venue owners charge an up-front fee to performing artists for the use of their facilities. The practice began in Los Angeles, California, during the 1980s. It has become common in many U.S. cities at low-turnout all-ages shows where performers are required to guarantee a minimum attendance through pre-show ticket sales. Pay-to-play gigs are a contentious practice in the UK, and some of the largest pay-to-play gig organisers have generated large amounts of discussion and criticism.

The term pay-to-play was also used as the title to a song by the band Nirvana (later renamed to "Stay Away"). The refrain referred to the practice of a band or their record label paying radio stations to put a song into heavy rotation. The phrase is also the title to a song by the band Cringer, in which they denounce the practice.

Music Supervision is a booming field in the music industry, whose professionals place music in many kinds of film, television, commercial, web-based and other live and recorded media cues. While some music supervisors are paid only by their employer or per-project, some companies use a pay-to-play model wherein artists pay to submit tracks for consideration to a variety of media concerns, only to have to pay the Music Supervision intermediary again at a cost of half of its earning for the track placement should it win a placement.

=== Online gaming ===
The term is also used as slang to refer to Internet services that require that users pay to use them. Usually, it refers to MMORPGs, where players must pay to maintain a playing account, as is the case with Eve Online or World of Warcraft. This is in contrast to free-to-play games. Many formerly pay-to-play MMORPGs have switched to a free-to-play model, including EverQuest, Star Wars: The Old Republic, Aion: The Tower of Eternity, and The Lord of the Rings Online. The game RuneScape features both free accounts for no money or pay-to-play accounts, with a much larger list of features.

The term may also refer to something like the online game Habbo Hotel, where there are games inside the game, which you may pay-to-play to join into a game whilst it is in progress.

=== Stand-up comedy ===
In a pay-to-play gig, the performer will either pay the promoter some money to be allowed to perform at the show, or will have to offer some in-kind payment. In a conventional comedy club, the promoter will pay the acts for their performance, and will raise the money to stage the gig by charging the audience. Some clubs offer open mic slots, where newer acts are allowed to learn the craft, unpaid; this is not the same as pay-to-play. Many comedians are against pay-to-play schemes, which they consider exploitative.

Pay-to-play was cited as a cause of major damage to the quality of the New York comedy scene. In economic terms, a pay-to-play strategy elevates those people who can afford to perform for nothing, or can afford to pay for their stage-time, which has nothing to do with their quality as an act. The pay-to-play promoter is able to profit from the goodwill and desire to perform of the acts, while discouraging appearances by those who cannot afford to perform without payment.

In some shows, the performer is asked to bring a certain number of paying audience members. As a payment-in-kind policy, this has caused similar controversy to pay-to-play. A show where the acts are obliged to bring the audience is called a bringer.

=== Visual arts ===
Similar to the trend cited above in music, pay-to-play is the practice of visual artists paying gallery owners, dealers, curators, publishers, festival and contest sponsors, and better-established artists to critique, review, judge, exhibit, collect, or publish works created in such disparate media as painting, photography, video, and sculpture. Pay-to-play is a type of vanity gallery. Pay-to-play is characterized by cash flow that moves away from visual artists. Pay-to-play is sold to visual artists and justified by visual artists as "an investment in future sales" and may be self-victimization.

== In engineering, design, and construction ==
Pay-to-play in the engineering, design, and construction industry can refer to:

1. monetary and gift exchanges to persuade decision-makers such that they make decisions in favor of those offering the money or gifts;
2. exchanges of money or gifts and providing sponsorships such that the engineering, design, or construction company gets considered for work that would not otherwise be available (this in essence becomes a type of pre-qualification for work—contracts; and
3. illegal acts of bribery.

Pay-to-play might also be used to explain the appearance of engineering, design, and construction public work being done not in an open and fair manner.

PwC's 2014 Global Economic Crime Survey explored financial corruption in the construction industry. This survey found that asset misappropriation and bribery were the most prevalent crimes, with nearly 70% of crimes being perpetrated by insiders. In 2018, 14 people were charged with bribe-taking, money laundering, grand larceny and other charges relating to construction projects at Bloomberg LP's offices in New York.

== In corporate finance ==
Pay-to-play is a provision in a corporation's charter documents (usually inserted as part of a preferred stock financing) that requires stockholders to participate in subsequent stock offerings in order to benefit from certain antidilution protections. If the stockholder does not purchase his or her pro rata share in the subsequent offering, then the stockholder loses the benefit(s) of the anti-dilution provisions. In extreme cases, investors who do not participate in subsequent rounds must convert to common stock, thereby losing the protective provisions of the preferred stock. This approach minimizes the fears of major investors that small or minority investors will benefit by having the major investors continue providing needed equity, particularly in troubled economic circumstances for the company. It is considered a "harsh" provision that is usually only inserted when one party has a strong bargaining position.

== In finance ==
In the finance industry, the term pay-to-play describes the practice of giving gifts to political figures in the hopes of receiving investment business in return.

In the U.S., after discovering that this practice was not uncommon and was undermining the integrity of the financial markets, the U.S. Securities and Exchange Commission (SEC), the Financial Industry Regulatory Authority (FINRA) and the Municipal Securities Rulemaking Board (MSRB) severely regulated and limited the interactions and gifts-giving practices between the investment industry personnel and politicians and candidates. This can be seen most notably in Rule 206(4)-5 of the Investment Advisers Act of 1940 and Rules G-37 and G-38 of the MSRB Rule Book.

Pay-to-play occurs when investment firms or their employees make campaign contributions to politicians or candidates for office in the hope of receiving business from the municipalities that those political figures represent. It usually applies to investment banking firms that hope to receive municipal securities underwriting business in return or to investment management firms that hope to be selected for the management of government funds such as state pension funds.

An example of this form of corruption or bribery is the 2009 probe by then New York State Attorney General Andrew Cuomo into private equity funds payments to placement agents with political connections to obtain business with the New York State Common Retirement System.

== In politics ==
In politics, pay-to-play refers to a system, akin to payola in the music industry, by which one pays (or must pay) money to become a player. Almost always used in criticism, the phrase also refers to the increasing cost of elections and the "price of admission" just to run for office and the concern "that one candidate can far outspend his opponents, essentially buying the election".

Typically, the payer (an individual, business, or organization) makes campaign contributions to public officials, party officials, or parties themselves, and receives political or pecuniary benefits such as no-bid government contracts, influence over legislation, political appointments or nominations, special access or other favors. The contributions, less frequently, may be to nonprofit or institutional entities, or may take the form of some benefit to a third party, such as a family member of a governmental official. Incumbent candidates and their political organizations are typically the greatest beneficiaries of pay-to-play. Both the Democratic and Republican parties have been criticized for the practice.

While the direct exchange of campaign contributions for contracts is the most visible form of pay-to-play, the greater concern is the central role of money in politics, and its skewing of both the composition and the policies of government. Thus, those who can pay the price of admission, such as to a $1000/plate dinner or $25,000 "breakout session", gain access to power and/or its spoils, to the exclusion of those who cannot or will not pay: "giving certain people advantages that other[s] don't have because they donated to your campaign". Good-government advocates consider this an outrage because "political fundraising should have no relationship to policy recommendations". Citizens for Responsible Ethics in Washington called the "pay-to-play Congress" one of the top 10 scandals of 2008.

Many seeking to ban or restrict the practice characterize pay-to-play as legalized corruption. Pay-to-Play practices have come under scrutiny by both the federal government and several states. In Illinois, federal prosecutors in 2006 were investigating "pay-to-play allegations that surround Democratic Illinois Gov. Rod Blagojevich's administration". The allegations of pay-to-play in Illinois became a national scandal after the arrest of Gov. Blagojevich in December 2008, on charges that, among other things, he and a staffer attempted to "sell" the vacated U.S. Senate seat of then-president-elect Barack Obama.

Many agencies have been created to regulate and control campaign contributions. Furthermore, many third-party government "watchdog" groups have formed to monitor campaign donations and make them more transparent. The U.S. Securities and Exchange Commission has created a rule that puts some restrictions on asset managers when they make campaign contributions. The New York and Tennessee Republican parties filed a lawsuit against the SEC in August over the 2010 rule, arguing that it impedes free speech and seeking a preliminary injunction against the rule. U.S. District Judge Beryl Howell questioned whether the parties have standing to bring the case, noting they failed to name the potential donors and did not cite any investment advisers who are upset about the rule.

The opposite of a pay-to-play system is "fair and open"; the New Jersey Pay-to-Play Act specifically sets out bid processes that are or are not considered fair and open, depending upon who has contributed what to whom. In a series of academic research articles, Christopher Cotton shows how selling access may lead to better policy decisions compared to other means of awarding access. He also illustrates how wealthy interest groups are not necessarily better off from having better access to politicians.

Because of individual federal campaign contribution limits in the wake of the Bipartisan Campaign Reform Act (McCain-Feingold), pay-to-play payments of "soft money" (money not contributed directly to candidate campaigns and that does not "expressly advocate" election or defeat of a candidate) donations to state parties and county committees have come under greater scrutiny. This method refers to money that is donated to an intermediary with a higher contribution limit, which in turn donates money to individual candidates or campaign committees who could not directly accept the payor's funds.

== See also ==
- Slotting fee, pay-to-stay
- Bid rigging
- Bosman ruling
- Bribery
- Bribery Act 2010, UK
- Conflict of interest
- Influence peddling
- Corruption
- Corruption in the United States
- Foreign Corrupt Practices Act
- American Anti-Corruption Act
- Organized crime
- Principal–agent problem
- Transparency International
- Quid pro quo
- Paywall
- Subscription business model
