= RuneScape: Dragonwilds =

- Developer: Jagex
- Publisher: Jagex
- Composers: Ashton Mills; Peter Michael Davison; (Note: Others composers who worked in the soundtrack are Ally Banayoti, The Purcell Sin, Andrew Dodds, Vicki Swan, Jonny Dyer, Karlotta Skagfield and Sam Jones.)
- Series: RuneScape
- Engine: Unreal Engine 5
- Platforms: Nintendo Switch 2; PlayStation 5; Windows; Xbox Series X/S
- Release: April 15, 2025 (early access); September 15, 2026 (full release)
- Genre: Survival
- Modes: Single-player, multiplayer

RuneScape: Dragonwilds is an open-world survival game. It is a spin-off from the MMORPG RuneScape, taking place within the same fantasy world of Gielinor, in a specific continent called Ashenfall. It was developed by Jagex and it launched in early access for Windows on April 15, 2025.

== Gameplay ==
RuneScape: Dragonwilds is a cooperative survival game for one to four players. Players can level up their skills and craft items, with more advanced skills and abilities becoming available to players once they achieve higher skill levels. The gameplay will also feature a strong focus on magic abilities, with spells being used for combat and more mundane tasks such as woodcutting. Players will have the option to set up bases across the land to store their equipment, and Lodestones can be used for fast travel across the world. Players will be able to fight dragons, and a farming skill will allow players to grow their own crops. There will be a Creative mode allowing players to build, and a Hardcore mode where enemies will be harder to defeat.

== Development ==
RuneScape: Dragonwilds was first announced on March 31, 2025. It then launched in Early Access on April 15, 2025. On June 5, 2026, Jagex announced the full release, including console release, would be on September 15, 2026.

== Reception ==
=== Early Access critical reception ===
The Early Access version of RuneScape: Dragonwilds has received mixed to mildly positive reviews from critics. GamingBible.com awarded it a score of seven out of ten, saying "However, due to its lack of originality and some frustrating features, Dragonwilds struggles to stand amongst the greats and as a result, could easily be cast aside by fans of the genre."

IGN Benelux awarded it a score of 6.5 out of ten, praising it for staying true to the core elements of RuneScape while criticising the relative lack of innovation. David Jagneaux at Forbes praised the gameplay flow and the nuances of the skills, in addition to its familiarity to the early RuneScape game, saying, "I haven’t actively played RuneScape in many, many years but I still got a nice surge of nostalgia booting this new game up for the first time." Laura Bergin at PCGamesN also felt the game was generic, saying, "For now, however, Dragonwilds doesn't quite separate itself from the survival crowd."

=== Full release critical reception ===
Reception

Aggregate scores
Aggregator	Score
Metacritic	(PC) 78/100 (NS2) 78/100
OpenCritic	74% recommend

Review score
Publication	Score
Nintendo Life	7/10

The PC and Nintendo Switch 2 versions of RuneScape: Dragonwilds both received generally favorable reviews from critics, according to the review aggregation website Metacritic. Fellow review aggregator OpenCritic assessed that the game received strong approval, being recommended by 74% of critics.

Ethan Zack of Nintendo Life praised the open-world and the skill system but was critical of the difficulty level, awarded it a score of 7 out of 10 and saying "In melding the mechanics of popular survival games with classic RPG elements from the MMO that inspired it, RuneScape: Dragonwilds crafts a solid experience that honours the spirit of its namesake." Sam Comrie of Pocket Tactics praised the overall gameplay, skill progression system, visuals, soundtrack, and the simplicity of the tasks, awarding it 9 out of 10, and saying "Dragonwilds has reminded me exactly why I fell for RuneScape in the first place." Zubi Khan of CGMagazine awarded it a score of 8.5 out of 10, praising the varied aspects of the gameplay and the skill progression system, saying "RuneScape: Dragonwilds is a familiar yet bold twist on a classic, melding together different genres into a fun and addictive experience that seemingly has only just begun."

=== Sales ===
RuneScape: Dragonwilds sold over 600,000 digital copies on Early Access within its first week of release. In June 2026, it was announced that the game had sold over one-million digital copies in Early Access.
