= Krrb =

Classified advertising website

Krrb Classifieds
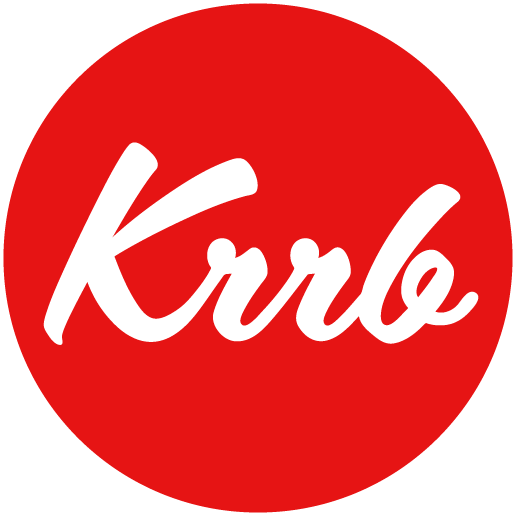
- Company type: Classifieds, E-commerce
- Website type: Hyperlocal marketplace
- Available in: English, French, Spanish
- Headquarters: Brooklyn, New York City, United States
- Area served: Worldwide
- Owners: Krrb, Inc. (January 1, 2011)
- Founder: George Eid
- Employees: 8
- Parent: AREA 17
- Website: krrb.com
- Registration: Required to buy or sell
- Users: 130,721 (July 2015)
- Launched: November 18, 2010
- Written in: Ruby (programming language)

Krrb (pronounced 'curb') was a hyperlocal classified advertising website that allowed individuals and businesses to sell items. Members of the website could also list real estate, housing, events, services, jobs and community notices.

== Overview ==
The website was based on the idea of neighborhood garage sale or flea market, prioritizing proximity over categorization so that users could see listings nearest to them. Each seller got a personal storefronts (known as 'corners') where all their listings were displayed.

As of October 2014, the company had 31,332 listings from 92,341 members in 3,211 cities and 118 countries.

The website's domain was no longer operational as of March 2017.

== History ==
George Eid created an "online flea market" designed to be a competitor to craigslist. Krrb.com was launched in November 2010 and incorporated as Krrb, Inc. in January 2011. The company is headquartered in Brooklyn, New York City and is privately owned by Area 17, an interactive agency based in New York City and Paris, France.

Luis Lavena, core developer of the programming language Ruby, designed and developed the software and led the engineering team. Interactive art director Arnaud Mercier (now deceased) designed the logo and user interface. Andrew Wagner, former editor of ReadyMade, American Craft and Dwell Magazine and columnist for the New York Times, joined the company in 2011 as director and editor-in-chief. In 2014, Phil Jeffs, director of product at Area 17, joined the team to lead product development.

== Krrb classifieds network ==
In 2012, Krrb partnered with Apartment Therapy to create classifieds for the site. Following this, Krrb created a classifieds network of other targeted classified sites. The Krrb Classified Network was released in October 2013 with the launch of the Chicago Magazine Classifieds.

== Conflict with Craigslist ==
In February 2013, Craigslist attorneys sent a cease-and-desist letter demanding that Krrb permanently disable its "Krrb It" button, a bookmarklet tool that enables a registered user of Krrb to copy factual information from their own Craigslist posts to Krrb, using publicly-available information, and display in a way that is unique to Krrb. The company disabled the "Krrb It" button for Craigslist.
