= Betrayal at Falador =

Fantasy novel

RuneScape: Betrayal at Falador
- Author: T. S. Church
- Language: English
- Series: RuneScape
- Genre: Fantasy
- Publisher: Babel Interactive Ltd.
- Publication date: July 21, 2008
- Publication place: United Kingdom
- Media type: Print (Hardcover)
- Pages: 416
- ISBN: 978-0-9559-0780-7

Betrayal at Falador is a fantasy novel written by T. S. Church, set in the RuneScape universe. The book was released on July 21, 2008, and is the first RuneScape novel. Church set out to write a novel that appealed to gamers, as well as those who had never played RuneScape.

The book is set in the year 164 of the Fifth Age, five years before the events of RuneScape, and tells the story of the White Knights' encounter with a werewolf on the fictional world of Gielinor, and the long search that preceded. The novel is a narrative, with the action being narrated from human viewpoint. The protagonist is a young hunter, Kara-Meir, who is also featured in the RuneScape video game. Upon release, the book was overlooked by critics.

== Background ==
Betrayal at Falador is the first book released by Jagex, with Paul Gower noting "It's such great fun to see familiar details of the RuneScape world being used to concoct this exciting novel." The back cover of the book also had review comments from Paul Gower and "Zezima", the long-time number one ranked RuneScape player.

The book makes references to the death of Patroclus through the fate of the valet Bhuler, and the presence on opposing sides of characters called Marius and Sulla refers to events in the first century BC in the Roman Republic. Taking place in the Fifth Age of RuneScape, it is based on events that take place within the game.

On October 14, 2008, a copy of the book, signed by senior members of Jagex staff, the cover artist, and the author was placed on eBay by Jagex. The auction was run to raise funds for The Internet Watch Foundation. Jagex auctioned ten such copies of the novel, one per week over a period of ten weeks. A sequel to the book had a tentative release date of September/October 2009.

== Plot summary ==
Betrayal at Falador takes place in Gielinor, the fictional world of RuneScape, and begins with a woman known as Kara-Meir found near death within the walls of Falador Castle. Sir Amik Varze and his White Knights are determined to locate the attack's perpetrator, speculated to be a monster seen attacking travellers on the outskirts of the region.

Kara-Meir is rescued by the Knights of Falador, who retrieve from her three mysterious objects: a finely crafted sword with a green tinge, a strange ring broken into two and some white flowers. At the command of Sir Amik, Squire Theodore is sent to the town of Taverley to consult with the local druids about the flowers. Along the way, he witnesses the gruesome sight of a butchered gypsy caravan.

Upon his arrival at Taverley, Kaqemeex the druid confirms that the flowers are in fact snowdrops, which grow on Ice Mountain, adding further suspicion that Kara may be a spy. Doric, the dwarf, in the meantime is mobbed by a band of drunken farmers, and his home is burnt. This is because the attackers have been brainwashed by the H.A.M (Humans against Monsters) society. Returning to Falador, Squire Theodore meets Doric en route. Doric agrees to go to Falador in order to report the mobbing he suffered.

In Falador, Kara-Meir forces the werewolf Jerrod to escape the city. Jerrod later sides with Sulla, the Kinshra (Black knight) leader, in order to avenge his hatred against her.

Later on, Kara-Meir, Theodore, his mage friend Castimir, the scientist Ebenezer and Doric head to the Monastery of Saradomin. There, Kara-Meir hopes to reveal the identity of her parents. However, the Monastery is destroyed by the Kinshra after a short battle.

Late in the book, a battle between the Kinshra and the White Knights of Falador erupts in which Sulla attempts to erase Falador from history. Theodore and a group of friends head to Burthorpe and journey under the Ice Mountain in order to rally arms to defend Falador from defeat. Kara-Meir witnesses Master Phyllis's death - a man who took her in as a young child, teaching her how to fight and smith.

Eventually, help is summoned and Kara-Meir and Theodore lead an army of 1500 dwarfs and Imperial Guards. During the battle, Sir Amik is injured whilst in the field. Morale is low and so the valet Bhuler equips the master-at-arm's plate as a disguise to rally the knights. Bhuler is inevitably killed, a sacrifice which makes him a hero.

The identity of the traitor who attacked Kara-Meir is revealed to be Sir Finistere, who killed Bryant and Sir Erical and is chased down into the sewers by Ebenezer, Sir Tiffy Cashien and the squire Marius. He attempts to trap and kill the three of them, but is stopped by Sir Pallas, who he then kills. Ebenezer helps break the trap, and Sir Finistere is killed by Marius.

After the battle, about 10,000 citizens of Falador cheer Kara Meir and hail her a hero. Kara-Meir, accompanied by Gar'rth, the nephew of the werewolf Jerrod, help rebuild the Monastery. Gar'rth wants to track down his uncle. Meanwhile, Theodore decides to head to Varrock using his newfound fame to recruit for more to join his order. Doric has his case heard favourably and will rebuild his home. Whilst Jerrod the werewolf escapes and meets up with Sulla, who has lost his hands, once more. The two agree that there is more to be done in the future.

== Sequels ==
Betrayal at Falador had two sequels that continued its plot line. Return to Canifis is the second in the series of RuneScape novels. It was released on 22 March 2011 by publisher Titan Books. Legacy of Blood is the third in the series of RuneScape novels. It was released on 19 June 2012 by publisher Titan Books.
