= Hyperlocal =

Narrowly-focused news media

"Hyperlocal" (also written "hyper-local") is an adjective used to describe something as being "limited to a very small geographical area", and in particular, to anything "[e]xtremely or excessively local". It is applied in particular with regard to media output aimed at narrowly focused populations. It has otherwise been described as "information oriented around a well-defined community with its primary focus directed toward the concerns of the population in that community". The term can also be used as a noun in isolation, where it has been described as referring to "the emergent ecology of data (including textual content), aggregators, publication mechanism and user interactions and behaviors which centre on a resident of a location and the business of being a resident". More recently, the term hyperlocal has applied to uses of GPS technologies in the function of mobile device applications.

The term may have originated in 1921 in a small U.S. newspaper, in a description of trends in Central American national politics, reemerging perhaps with the 1989 The Washington Post description as "so-called hyperlocal", the aim for "tiny markets of 50,000 or less" by television cable news. The concept as applied to news, readily adopted in the Web 2.0 explosion of startup web-based news efforts, has subsequently gone through practical iterations with regard to its business application, as it has moved to refine its itself via the focus and aims of each enterprise (from competing in search space, to social networking, to news reporting).

== Coinage and definitions ==
"Hyperlocal" may have first appeared in 1921 in the adjectival description of a trend in the politics of some Central American nations, in a small Ohio newspaper.

Later in 20th century, it appeared in The Washington Post, being defined in 1989 in terms of "tiny markets of 50,000 or less" for television cable news, where the term hyperlocal was preceded by "so-called". The term appeared as "hyper-local" in a March 11, 1991 reference to viewer-tailoring of cable news content of a station in the Washington, D.C. area to give it slants, via "shorter [additional] news reports", that would make it attractive to viewers not just of the District of Columbia but also to additional viewers in suburban Maryland and Northern Virginia in a way that the article's author, Paul Farhi, described as "taking local coverage to the limit". By 1993, the term was appearing in academic volumes regarding the media industry, again in reference to the delivery of cable news content.

In a report from the British charitable organisation, Nesta, it was defined as "online news or content services pertaining to a town, village, single postcode or other small, geographically defined community".

As of 2024, the adjective was being defined by Merriam-Wester as "limited to a very small geographical area", and by the OED as describe anything "[e]xtremely or excessively local", in particular with regard to media output (web, television, etc.) focused on such narrow populations.

== Content ==
Hyperlocal content primarily has two key dimensions: geography and time. These dimensions measure the relevance of content to consumers at specific locations and times. In other words, the higher the degree of alignment on these two dimensions, the more appealing the content becomes to individuals, while its relevance to a broader audience is relatively lower. Hyperlocal content is typically targeted at or consumed by users located within clearly defined areas (such as streets, neighborhoods, or cities), and it requires the content to be both timely and continually updated. Historically, the development of hyperlocal content has exhibited distinct characteristics: in earlier periods, content was generally broader in both geographical reach and timeliness, aimed at meeting the needs of larger populations. In contrast, modern hyperlocal content has become more refined on both fronts. For example, traditional methods of information dissemination such as almanacs, town criers, or infrequently issued bulletins had lower scores on both geographic and time dimensions, whereas today’s mobile applications that leverage the Internet and GPS technology are capable of delivering highly customized information to users located within a range of a few meters or blocks within seconds or minutes. This evolution indicates that with advancements in technology and changes in user needs, content providers are able to more precisely meet demands in both time and space, thus enabling a more personalized and immediate flow of information.

== Websites ==
Hyperlocal websites can focus on very specialized topics—i.e., stories and issues of interest only to people in a very limited area—e.g., school board meetings, neighborhood restaurants, meetings of community groups, and garage sales can receive prominent coverage. Specific examples include Forumhome.org, which focuses on issues likely of interest only to the few thousand residents of the small New Hampshire towns it serves, and Rheebo.com, a hyperlocal website that builds communities around things people are passionate about.

Hyperlocal sites may also emphasize particular subsets of issues; for instance, the former award-winning NewWest.net site—that covered events of the Rocky Mountain West [of the United States] through ca. August 2011—including through the use of freelancers and citizen contributors, stated that it sought to be "a network of online communities... aim[ing] to serve as a nexus of dialogue and a smart guide to the news and issues..." including with regard to "culture, economy, politics, [and] environment"... around "common interests and hopes for the region as it wrestles with growth and change", thus identifying the tension between economic development and environmental concerns as an emphasis. Further text ascribed to NewWest.net states that its "core mission is to serve the Rockies with innovative, participatory journalism and to promote conversation that help us understand and make the most of the dramatic changes sweeping our region".

In recent years hyperlocal websites have been created to enable the concepts of the sharing economy or collaborative consumption, allowing peer communities to share human or physical assets. Examples include Yelp, Airbnb, TaskRabbit, eBay, Craigslist and Krrb. Many of the best-known hyperlocal news sites have sprung up independently, with the battle cry "local doesn't scale", but larger media companies have been interested in the concept as well. Nicholas Birns has described the hyperlocal as :between the domestic and the regional/national. David Harte, Rachel Howells, and Andy WIlliams state that the hyperlocal journalist is "closer to a social entrepreneur" than a traditional newswriter, and is as "tech- and business-savvy" as they are "civic minded".

Some hyperlocal sites include detailed searchable community events calendars and restaurant information, a complete listing of churches (including 360-degree inside views and recordings of sermons), and police blotter information updated every day. Formerly a subsidiary of AOL, Patch Media runs a large U.S.-based hyperlocal network of sites that includes news and other such features and aspects. The concept, as applied to news, was readily adopted in the Web 2.0 explosion of startup web-based news efforts, has, however, subsequently gone through practical iterations with regard to its business application, as it has moved to refine its itself via the focus and aims of each enterprise (from competing in search space, to social networking, to news reporting). Regarding the Patch.com case, according to Tom Kaneshige's March 2015 article in CIO magazine,

Legions of underserved local advertisers were supposed to flock to Patch sites, leaving national publishers in the collective dust. ... Of course, this wasn't how it played out. Scores of Patch sites were left inactive as the a company reexamined its strategy. Sure, hyperlocal content sounded great – everyone wants to know what's happening around them – but the flawed business model couldn't sustain it. Not enough big advertisers were targeting local markets.

Another model for a national company running hyperlocal sites is franchising, such as was being done by 2010 startup Main Street Connect.

The Washington Post Company made a commitment earlier to develop a specifically described hyperlocal focus, in work of Rob Curley, who, by the description of journalist Carl Lavin, had worked earlier to increase page views at websites in other locales (Lawrence and Naples are mentioned). Curley has been called a "hyperlocal guru" for his previous work. The first Curley-led effort for WashingtonPost.com focused on Loudoun County, which Lavin describes as "diverse and spread across a vast area", and so "hyper local [sic.] only in contrast to the huge reach of the mother paper".

Beginning in mid-year 2007 as "LoudounExtra.WashingtonPost.com", it included "all of... Loudoun County news from The Washington Post and the twice-weekly Loudoun Extra" as well as "the latest police reports, weather reports, [and] community news... throughout the day", and "feature news updates exclusive to LoudounExtra.com". It underwent rebranding to LoudenExtra.com, which between these dates, redirected to the Voices section of WashingtonPost.com (and now no longer functions). WashingtonPost.com had high hopes for its hyperlocal effort, with managing editor Jim Brady saying, "When you take our daily traffic and combine it with Rob Curley's expertise—if it can't work here, it can't work anywhere".

Other journalists expressed skepticism regarding the hyperlocal movement's focus on the often mundane information of daily life. Hyperlocal news "has the potential to trivialize a media organization's brand and further saturate news sites with myopic local (and frequently unedited) content, perhaps at the expense of foreign and national reporting", stated Donna Shaw in the American Journalism Review. Jonathan Weber, founder of NewWest.net, noted (regarding Backfence.com's closing) that the lack of an appropriate content or business focus, suited to its market, can also contribute to a hyperlocally directed enterprise to fail. Even so, as BBC's Van Klaveren has concluded, journalistic organizations might profit by embracing both so-called "big-J" journalism and the hyperlocal, saying "We need to move beyond news to information".

== Social media ==
As of 2017, it was noted in a case study that the information available on social media sites in practice spanned the range from hyperlocal, through to global. When hosting hyperlocal content, social networking sites also extensively distribute the continuum of content, hyperlocal to global, as hosted on other sites. This arises because of the contemporary nature of digital sharing and the predominantly local composition of user's network in which content is shared. This type of distribution is secondary (done by users) in contrast to the primary distribution done by the content hosting site itself (e.g. Craigslist).

In recent years there has been a shift in user behavior to use social networking sites for both creating and sharing hyperlocal content. Examples include WhatsApp being increasingly used for communication and organization, and eCommerce, despite having no specific feature support for these activities.

Facebook.com hosts sixty-fold more events than eVite.com, the leading site which specializes in events only. This user behavior suggests that an effective hyperlocal distribution is a more important consideration for users than the superior quality of the content itself. Since 2010, evidence shows that social networking sites have been mobilizing to aid and leverage this user behavior: Google acquired Zagat in 2011, and Facebook has been adding new features (e.g. Blogs, Events) since 2012 to create varied hyperlocal content, and announced in 2015 a feature allowing users to mark a post as sold (and later that year introduced C2C payments).

== Magazines and newspapers ==
While many traditional print publications are shutting down or publish exclusively online, local newspapers in small towns can still make a profit. In the United States, national companies that mail full-color glossy hyperlocal magazines to targeted neighborhoods include N2 Publishing and Best Version Media. Comparing themselves to Facebook, they publish mostly user-generated content written by local residents and homeowners associations.

== GPS-based mobile apps ==
The most recent incarnation of hyperlocal content grew out the combination of satellite based location services and advanced wireless data built into mobile devices. Satellite-based location services allow a high degree of physical location precision. When combined with a mobile device's access to the vast set of Internet data and services, hyperlocal takes on new dimensions. Realtime internet awareness of an individual's precise location in time allows people and entities to consume or deliver hyperlocal content that is relevant to specific individuals at very small time scales.

Hyperlocal GPS mobile apps, in particular, change the nature of human interaction with their environment by providing a much faster, richer and relevant source of information. The mobile Internet data connection available to hyperlocal apps allows GPS location data to be fused with Internet data to improve the decision process of the user. Examples of these types of hyperlocal content providers are Google Maps, Foursquare and LaunchLawyer. In contrast to printed maps, the mobile Google Maps app allows users to identify places and interests around their current GPS location. In contrast to rating services or directories, the mobile Foursquare app uses GPS location data to enable users to make more informed choices and receive better deals. In contrast to printed or online lawyer directories, the GPS-enabled LaunchLawyer mobile app combines GPS awareness with the ability to almost instantly get a lawyer. In each case the combination of mobile device, GPS and the Internet changed the manner in which consumption of information, services or goods took place.

== Market penetration ==
For large corporations, successfully targeting local populations can involve either shedding or leveraging corporate identity:

- Shedding corporate identity – Starbucks' 15th Avenue Coffee & Tea cafe in Seattle was not branded with its corporate owner until January 2011. Starbucks continued Roy Street Coffee as a separate brand. By shedding the corporate identity on that store, Starbucks hoped to better cater to the local culture through various events and unique offerings. Coffee tastings from experts and open mic night are examples of programs the national coffee chain offered without having it associated with the Starbucks brand.
- Leveraging corporate identity – The New York Times is tapping into the hyperlocal market online, through "mentor" programs. Essentially, the NY Times wants to have a hand in the editorial process of hundreds of local media outlets. By polishing online news content with their expertise, they seek to gain small portions of advertising revenue from those digital publications in whom they own a stake.

== Media structure ==
While there are various ways in which hyperlocal content is being created and published, blogs have become a key part of the hyperlocal ecology. Their basic roles evident in the space include individual blogs, blog networks, and aggregators.

Some others initiatives are made for this purpose in the US by the company Marchex, and in France by the network ProXiti. They are developing networks of thousands hyperlocal news sites like www.10282.net (Manhattan 212) or www.75016.info (paris 16eme arrondissement).

In response to the burgeoning number of hyperlocal news sites in New Jersey, The Citizens Campaign founded the Hyperlocal News Association (HNA). The HNA works to foster and encourage growth of new hyperlocal sites across the state.

== Other examples ==
Hyperlocal marketing is marketing for businesses focused on geographies such as neighborhoods, towns, streets, and spots located near well-known landmarks, e.g., a hyperlocal search for a 'coffee shop near me'.

There are other types of data which have hyperlocal relevance or interest to a narrow set of residents—e.g. a government statistic on crime rates in one's neighborhood—which, in nature, are data of a qualitatively different type.

== See also ==
- Location-based service
