= Jagex =

British video game developer and publisher

Jagex Limited

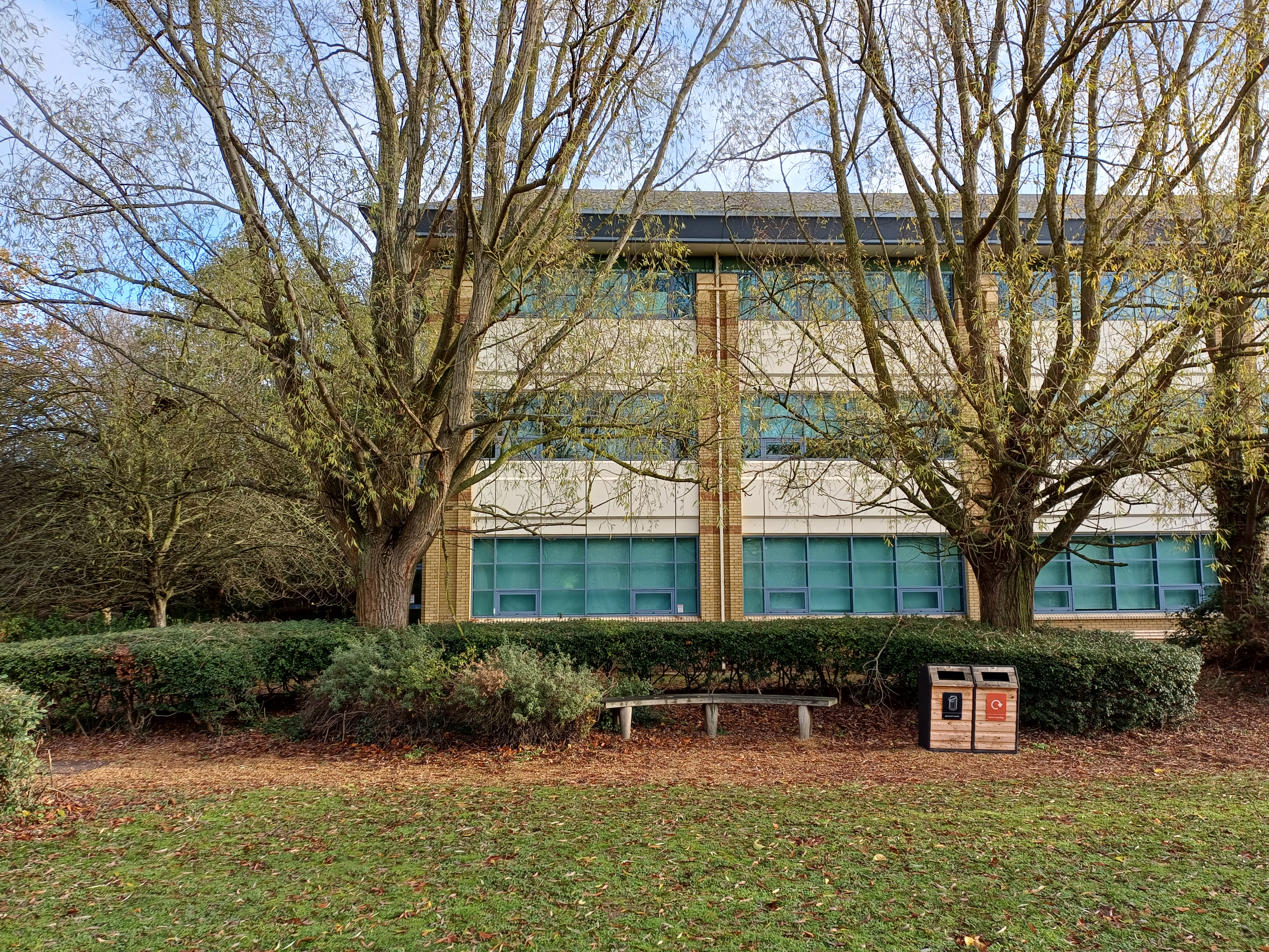
- Headquarters at Cambridge Science Park
- Type: Subsidiary
- Industry: Video games
- Founded: 1999; 27 years ago
- Founders: Andrew Gower; Paul Gower
- Headquarters: One Granta, Granta Park, Cambridge, CB21 6DP, Milton, England
- Key people: Jon Bellamy (CEO)
- Products: RuneScape; Old School RuneScape; Planetarion
- Number of employees: ▲495 (2024)
- Parent: Insight Venture Partners (2012–2016); Hongtou (2016–2020); Macarthur Fortune Holding (2020–2021); The Carlyle Group (2021–2024); CVC Capital Partners (2024–present)
- Subsidiaries: Gamepires
- Website: www.jagex.com

Jagex Limited is a British video game developer and publisher based at the Cambridge Science Park in Milton, Cambridgeshire. It is best known for RuneScape and Old School RuneScape, both free-to-play massively multiplayer online role-playing games.

In addition to RuneScape, Jagex has released multiple casual games on its FunOrb portal, as well as other titles. Jagex was owned by U.S. investors between 2012 and 2016, by Chinese investors from 2016 to 2020, by Macarthur Fortune Holding LLC in 2020, by The Carlyle Group from 2020 to 2024, and is presently owned by CVC Capital Partners.

== History ==
An early Jagex logo

Jagex was founded in 1999 by brothers Andrew and Paul Gower. That same year they began work on the MMORPG RuneScape, which was released in January 2001. In December 2001, Andrew Gower, Paul Gower, and Constant Tedder launched Jagex in its current incarnation, with Tedder as its CEO. Jagex formally acquired the Jagex name from Andrew Gower in 2001.

RuneScape grew dramatically; one year after its release over a million free accounts had been registered. The game was originally supported by advertisements, however, the dot-com bubble meant that there were fewer advertisers. The new company created a paid version of the game with extra features, to support hosting costs and continued development. The pay-to-play version of RuneScape was released on 27 February 2002. It gained 2,000 subscribers in the first hour and 5,000 subscribers in the first week, making it one of the largest Java pay-to-play games in the world at the time. In 2007, RuneScape achieved one million subscribers; 11 years after launch, the company touted 200 million accounts.

Until the release of War of Legends in 2010, the company used the slogan "Java Gaming Experts" as it had only produced games written in Java up to that point. Following the launch of the Flash-based War of Legends, the company name was said to stand for "Just About the Game Experience".

=== Company structure ===
As RuneScape gained users, Jagex grew. By 11 December 2003, RuneScape had 65,000 paying members, and Jagex had 29 employees. On 4 May 2007, RuneScape had over 6,000,000 active free accounts and over 1,000,000 active pay-to-play subscribers. By July 2012, Jagex had over 500 employees.

Initially, the company was self-funded; however, in October 2005, Jagex received an investment from Insight Venture Partners. On 23 October 2007, Geoff Iddison, former European CEO of PayPal, replaced Constant Tedder as CEO. Iddison resigned as CEO in January 2009, replaced by Mark Gerhard, who had been Jagex CTO before his appointment. Jagex became a member of the United Kingdom's game developer trade body, TIGA, on 15 April 2009. Richard Wilson, TIGA's CEO, described Jagex as "one of the most successful game developers in the world, not just the UK. Jagex has developed extraordinarily popular games and is at the leading edge in terms of online safety and security."

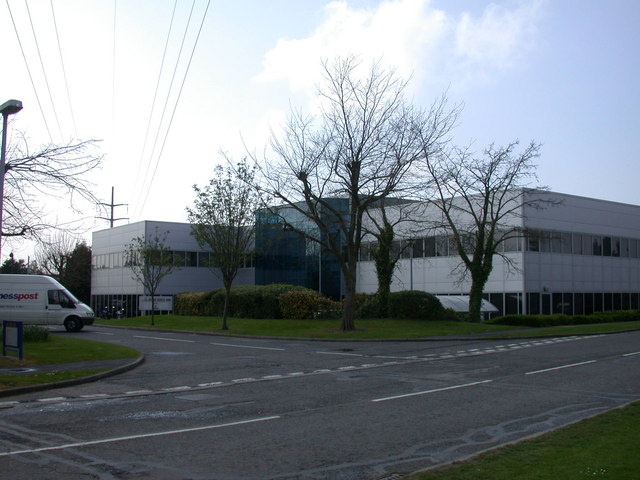
Former Jagex headquarters at 140 Cambridge Science Park

In December 2010 The Raine Group and Spectrum Equity Investors invested in the company, while Insight increased their investment. Andrew Gower, Paul Gower, and Constant Tedder left the board of directors at that time. In January 2012, Insight increased its stake in Jagex from 35% to 55%, giving it a controlling interest in the company. However, in an interview, Gerhard stated that Insight took their 55% stake 13 months prior in December 2010. On 11 September 2014, Mark Gerhard announced his resignation from Jagex by 2015. On 2 April 2015, Rod Cousens was appointed CEO of Jagex following his departure from Codemasters. In July 2016 Jagex was purchased by Hongtou, a Chinese investment company, which was subsequently acquired by Zhongji Holdings, which later changed its name to Fukong Interactive Entertainment. Jagex remained under Hongtou within Fukong's structure until it was sold to Macarthur Fortune Holding, a US-based asset management company, in April 2020 for $530 million.

Phil Mansell became Jagex' CEO in January 2017.

The Carlyle Group acquired a majority stake in the firm in January 2021 from Macarthur in a deal for an undisclosed amount. After announcement of this, Plutos Sama Holdings filed a legal complaint asserting that the sale of Jagex from Shanghai Hongtou to Macarthur was invalid due to past issues over business dealings with Shanghai Hongtou. Plutos Sama stated in their complaint they had put in a sole bid to acquire Hongtou, including Jagex, around August 2020, but this deal never was complete, but as it should have gone through, they are the rightful owners of Jagex.

In February 2024, CVC Capital Partners Fund VIII and Haveli Investments purchased Jagex from the Carlyle Group for £910 million.

In March 2025, Jon Bellamy succeeded Mansell as CEO of Jagex.

== Acquisitions ==
In July 2022, Jagex acquired US games company Pipeworks Studios, which was later sold to Virtuos Studios. In December 2022, Jagex acquired Gamepires, a Croatian studio that developed the open world survival game Scum.

== Charity fundraising ==
Since 2004 Jagex has made donations to a number of national and international charities, as well as running charity auctions for signed merchandise.

Jagex has donated artwork and prizes to the MMO Calendar, which raises funds for St. Jude Children's Research Hospital.

In 2013, Jagex introduced the "Well of Goodwill" to RuneScape, which allowed players to gift in-game items or wealth to charity, featuring a hi-scores page for the players who donated. For every 10 million gold pieces from the community, Jagex donated $2 to a range of charitable causes.

In July 2014, Jagex helped raise awareness about the illegal poaching of black and white rhinos by adding rhinoceros pets and trivia questions to RuneScape. This campaign was partnered with United for Wildlife.

Jagex raised over £445,000 in 2020, focusing on mental health and diversity and inclusion.

== Games ==
=== Developed ===
==== RuneScape ====
RuneScape is a fantasy MMORPG released in January 2001 by Andrew and Paul Gower. It was originally a graphical browser game implemented on the client-side in Java, and incorporates 3D rendering. The game has over 200 million registered accounts, and is recognised by the Guinness World Records as the world's most popular free-to-play MMORPG.

RuneScape takes place in the world of Gielinor, a medieval fantasy realm divided into different kingdoms, regions, and cities. Each region offers different types of monsters, resources, and quests to challenge players. The game's fictional universe has also been explored through a tie-in video game on its maker's other website, FunOrb, Armies of Gielinor, and the novels Betrayal at Falador, Return to Canifis and Legacy of Blood.

Players are represented in the game with customisable avatars. RuneScape does not follow a linear storyline; rather, players set their own goals and objectives. Players can choose to fight non-player character (NPC) monsters, complete quests, or increase their experience in the available skills. Players interact with each other through trading, chatting, or by participating in mini-games and activities, some of which are competitive or combative in nature, while others require cooperative or collaborative play.

An adult animated series inspired by the game is in development from Lyrical Animation and Meatier Productions.

===== Old School RuneScape =====
Old School RuneScape is a separate incarnation of RuneScape released on 22 February 2013, based on a copy of the game from August 2007. It was opened to paying subscribers after a poll to determine the level of support for releasing this game passed 50,000 votes (totaling 449,351 votes), followed by a free-to-play version on 19 February 2015. Old School RuneScape receives regular content updates, which must be voted on by its players before they can be added to the game. On 17 July 2017, Jagex announced the development of a mobile version of Old School RuneScape.

===== DarkScape =====
On 16 September 2015, Jagex released DarkScape, a separate version of RuneScape which featured open-world player versus player combat. DarkScape was originally released with most of RuneScape's content, but received separate content updates. DarkScape was completely free to play, with some additional benefits reserved for paying subscribers. On 29 February 2016, it was announced that DarkScape would close on 28 March due to lack of interest.

==== Block N Load ====
On 11 December 2014, Block N Load, a sandbox building tactical first-person shooter (FPS) game went into closed beta. On 5 March 2015, Jagex announced that Block N Load would be released for PC on 30 April 2015. On 25 July 2025, the developers announced via Steam that the game would be shut down on 1 August. The game was officially taken offline on that date.

==== FunOrb ====
FunOrb was a casual gaming site created by Jagex. Launched on 27 February 2008, it was the company's first major release after RuneScape. All of the games were programmed in Java. FunOrb was permanently shut down on the 7th of August 2018.

The site was mainly targeted towards the "hard casual", "deep casual" or "time-pressured" gamer market.

==== 8Realms ====
8Realms was an HTML-based empire-building massively multiplayer online strategy game developed by Jagex. It was the company's first internally developed MMORTS, and second published MMORTS after War of Legends.

The 8Realms closed beta was released on 5 May 2011; players were given advanced access to the closed beta by invitation and through the game's Facebook page. On 28 May 2012, Jagex announced they were closing the game, stating that "it has become clear that the game doesn't meet our high expectations for success."

==== Carnage Racing ====
On 11 October 2012 Jagex announced it was developing a racing game on Facebook called Carnage Racing. The game runs on the Unity game engine and was released in November 2012.

==== Chronicle: RuneScape Legends ====
Jagex announced Chronicle: RuneScape Legends at RuneFest 2014 for launch in the coming year. It allows players to build their own adventure with cards using characters from RuneScape.

On 25 November 2015 Chronicle entered closed beta, and it was released on Steam on 26 May 2016. On 8 May 2018, it was announced that the game would be removed due to "multiple technical issues" combined with a dwindling player base. The servers for the game remained running until 6 August 2018.

==== RuneScape: Dragonwilds ====
A cooperative survival game titled RuneScape: Dragonwilds was released via Steam's early access in April 2025.

=== Published ===
==== War of Legends ====
War of Legends was an MMORTS set in a world of ancient Chinese mythology, which was released on 19 January 2010. It was Jagex's first MMORTS, the company's first externally developed game, the first game published by Jagex not to be written in Java, and the company's first microtransactional game. The game was shut down on 22 December 2014, and on 29 January 2015 Jagex announced that the game would not come back online due to security issues that could not be resolved by the external development studio.

==== Planetarion ====
Since 26 July 2010, Jagex has owned the rights to the online space warfare game, Planetarion. Although Jagex initially intended to develop the game further themselves, in 2013 they licensed the IP to a third party developer. Planetarion has been online since 2000 and has a loyal player base.

==== Herotopia ====
On 10 May 2011 Jagex announced that it was working with the New York-based children's media company Herotainment to publish a new browser-based game called Herotopia, which was released on 25 May. According to Jagex the game will be a "virtual world which provides kids with a fun and enjoyable experience they can make their own." The game is now closed.

==== Ace of Spades ====
On 1 November 2012 it was announced that Jagex would publish the sandbox game Ace of Spades. The game was released on Steam on 12 December 2012. The game's servers were shut down on 6 March 2019.

==== Space Punks ====
On 1 July 2021, Jagex announced it was publishing a loot shooter called Space Punks, developed by games studio Flying Wild Hog. It launched in early access on the Epic Games Store on the 14 July.

==== Melvor Idle ====
On 21 October 2021, Jagex announced it was publishing a Runescape-inspired idle game called Melvor Idle. The game is being developed in partnership with its previous solo developer Brendan Malcolm, of Games By Malcs. It left early access a month prior to the partnership announcement.

==== Mobile ====
Jagex released its first mobile game, Bouncedown, for the iPhone and iPod Touch on 3 December 2009, followed by StarCannon on 15 April 2010, Miner Disturbance on 8 June 2010, and Undercroft on 23 September 2010.

8Realms, the company's first HTML based game, was designed to work on the iPad. Mobile clients for Old School RuneScape and RuneScape released on 30 October 2018 and 17 June 2021, respectively.

=== Cancelled games ===
==== Transformers Universe ====
On 14 March 2011, Jagex announced a partnership with Hasbro to create a Transfomers Universe MMO based on the Transformers intellectual property that was due to launch in North America, Latin America, Europe, New Zealand and Australia in 2013. The game entered open beta on 4 July 2014, but it was announced on 16 December 2014 that the game would be cancelled and the beta shut down on 31 January 2015.

==== Stellar Dawn ====
Stellar Dawn was an upcoming browser-based sci-fi themed MMORPG under development by Jagex. Originally known as MechScape, the project was scrapped and renamed after it was decided that the completed project did not meet the standards of the original design brief. The project was overhauled and formally announced as Stellar Dawn on 14 July 2010 when Jagex released the official Stellar Dawn website. On 10 August 2010 the first official Stellar Dawn teaser was released. The game was slated for a 2011 launch, but in March 2012 Jagex announced that development had been paused in favour of Transformers Universe and RuneScape.

==== RuneScape: Idle Adventures ====
RuneScape: Idle Adventures was an idle game set in the RuneScape universe developed by Hyper Hippo Productions. A closed beta was opened on Steam on 23 April 2016, then was subsequently shutdown on 15 May 2017 due to lack of users.
