= War of Legends =

2010 video game

- Developer: Ultizen
- Publisher: Jagex
- Platform: Flash
- Release: 19 January 2010
- Genre: Fantasy Manhua MMORTS
- Mode: Multiplayer

War of Legends was a massively multiplayer online strategy game set in "a world of ancient Chinese mythology" and was published by Jagex on January 19, 2010. It was the company's first full online strategy game, the first game to be published by the company rather than produced by them, the first game published by Jagex not to be written in Java, and the company's first microtransaction game. On January 29, 2015, Jagex announced that the game would be permanently closed effective immediately, following a security issue that took the game offline over a month earlier on December 22, 2014.

== Gameplay ==
The game was a real-time strategy game in which players took the role of a "LEGEND" who controlled a kingdom. The aim of the game was to develop the kingdom through the construction and upgrading of buildings in cities, recruit armies with which to defend their cities and attack other players, the research of various skills to perform tasks more effectively and to gather resources with which to pay for these activities. Players could also choose to complete Tasks to gain various stat and item bonuses.

Players were able to choose the gender of their legend as well as either the Monk, Seer, or Warrior avatar. Players were also able to choose the region their city takes place in. Gender had a purely cosmetic effect whilst avatar and landscape type altered their abilities in game. The "Legends" were "great heroes" who lead the armies in the game. Players were able to recruit further NPC Legends by reaching set game criteria.

The player started with one city, but with a higher position in the game, they could build 'sub-cities' on flat ground. The maximum amount of sub-cities a player could have is determined by their official position, to a current maximum of seven (Eight cities in total, including the capital) as of December 2015. Players had the option of creating buildings, harvesting resources, and training an army. Every building was rated by a "level" system, the maximum of which was 30 (Reaching Civic Custodian), but outskirts buildings could go up to the level of 25 with the use of advanced sketches (an in game item), and famous cities (special sub-cities that can't be made by players) could go up to 25 or 30 on both city and outskirts, depending on what type it was. There were 3 areas available to players, their city, outskirts (where resource buildings were kept) and the map where other players cities and wildlands were among other things. There were five different resources: Gold, stone, copper, food, and wood. A player's city was always "live" in the game, which means the city could be attacked even when the player was not logged on. War of Legends offered new players a "new player protection" where they were protected for the first seven days of their gameplay. This prevented them from being attacked by other players. This protection wore off after the seventh day of play or if their palace (central building) was upgraded to a level of 10 or higher.

The game ranked players and alliances based on their reputation, like to send an army to explore an area and may fight another army to gain reputation. As to a special paradise level 4 or 5. while also ranking Legends based on level and stats and cities based on level and population.

If players successfully built an 'ally base' they could join player alliances, bringing new tasks, items, other players to talk with, to help or be helped or simply chat. Players could donate gold and WoLcash to their alliances to help raise their levels and help towards research. With a level 2 ally base players could create their own alliance allowing 7 people in it. This amount could be raised by upgrading the ally base in a player's city.

== Holidays ==
Like other Jagex games, holidays came with special events - often allowing players to get significantly more power during the events than those who missed the events. Past events (in Jagex's English version) have fallen on the Chinese New Year, the War of Legends anniversary (around the same time as the Chinese New Year), St. Patrick's Day, Easter, Halloween, and Christmas.

== History ==
War of Legends was released on 19 January 2010 as Jagex's first non-Java based game, and first to feature microtransactions. It was officially released out of beta on 31 March 2010 with a large update released simultaneously, players registered before this time were given in-game items (gold charm, divine boon, coffer) as a reward.

War of Legends was closed on December 22, 2014, due to a security hack. It was later confirmed on January 29, 2015, that the game would not be coming back. Players that had bought JCredits prior to November 22 could get a monetary refund. The forums remained open until February 11.

== Awards and accomplishments ==
In March 2013 War of Legends won game of the month on MPOGD.

== Business model / WoLCash ==
While the game was free-to-play, players can choose to purchase a variety of in-game items through the use of the "WoLCash" / Jagex microtransaction system. The in-game items could be used to speed up development, train new skills, and make more money, giving paying players an advantage over non-paying players. Players can, with the completion of tasks, obtain 'vouchers' which work the same as Wolcash, but could be obtained for free; however, they cannot be used to buy all items.

This is the first time that Jagex had used a microtransaction system.

WoLCash was originally called JCreds until Jagex changed their name. Many veteran players still call them "jc" (short for JCreds).

In early versions of the game, JCreds could only be spent to buy things from the official shop. A later update allowed players to sell legends, equipment, and other items to each other for WoLCash. In this way, players could get WoLCash, without spending real money, by selling their own legends or items to other players. Jagex deducts a "sales tax" for every such transaction, so that eventually enough WoLCash will be drained out of the in-game economy to force players to spend real money to continue using WoLCash.

For the 2013 anniversary of War of Legends, all old accounts were able to get 1000 WoLCash (or $100) - one of the most significant special event gifts in the game's history.

== See also ==
- Evony
