= The Citizens Campaign =

Advocacy group in New Jersey, US

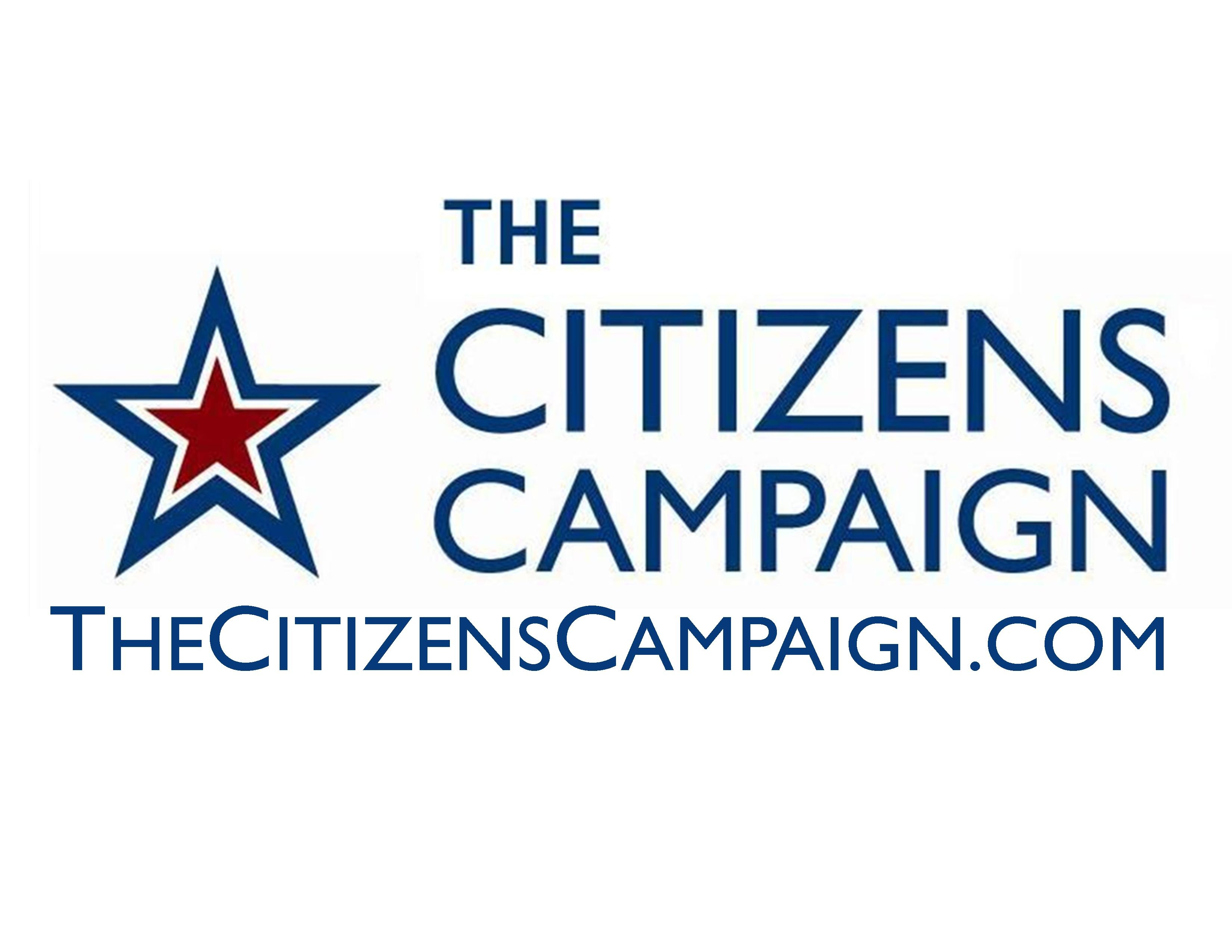
- Founded: 1998
- Founder: Harry & Caroline Pozycki
- Purpose: Civic education and empowerment, local politics, ending government corruption
- Location: Metuchen, New Jersey
- Region served: New Jersey
- Employees: 10
- Website: https://thecitizenscampaign.org/
- Formerly called: The Center for Civic Responsibility; 1998-2004

The Citizens Campaign (formerly The Center for Civic Responsibility) is a non-profit, nonpartisan organization based in Metuchen, New Jersey. It aims to provide US citizens with tools and training for effecting political change in their community. The group was founded by Harry and Caroline Pozycki in 1998, and draws support from experts in law, government, and politics including former New Jersey Supreme Court Justice Gary Stein, Dean of the Annenberg School of Communications at the University of Pennsylvania Michael Delli Carpini, and former Counsels to Governor Tom Kean and Brendan Byrne, among others.

== Citizen Leadership ==
The Citizens Campaign defines what it calls the four major "power centers" of government: elected council or committee, the school board, the planning board, and local political parties and has identified the five paths to power for citizens in the community. These positions do not require a person to run for office or spend money, but still give regular citizens the power to make important decisions that will affect the community. In Citizen Power: A Citizen Leadership Manual (Rutgers University Press), Harry Pozycki outlines these four power centers and aims to describe ways for regular citizens to influence each.

The group also defines what it calls four main "paths to power" for citizens:

- "Citizen leaders", defined as citizens who have the know-how to effectively initiate and gain the adoption of constructive proposals, whether in the form of a new law, new policy or other positive change
- "Solutions Advocates", citizens who report on what is happening in the community
- "Local political party representatives", neighborhood-level representatives for each of the political parties
- "Local government appointees", citizens appointed to posts on local, county and state boards and commissions who carry influence on policy making and quality-of-life issues

== Structure ==
The Citizens Campaign has a full-time staff of 9, and more than 300 volunteer government and political experts who compose the Law and Policy Task Force, the Academy for Citizen Empowerment, and the New Jersey Hyperlocal News Association.

=== Law and Policy Task Force ===
The Law and Policy Task Force, chaired by Former New Jersey Supreme Court Justice Gary Stein, is a volunteer network of legal and governmental experts who develop model legislation and cost-cutting proposals for local and state adoption. The Task Force is composed of about 50 New Jersey lawyers who work to develop model laws pertaining to expanding citizen rights and eliminating government waste, including competitive insurance purchasing, pay-to-play reform, increasing access to public records, and political party committee transparency. Currently, over 200 New Jersey municipalities have adopted and implemented a Citizens Campaign model ordinance.

=== Civic Trusts ===
The Citizens Campaign established Civic Trusts in urban, economically challenged areas in New Jersey. Civic Trusts are non-partisan, local civic associations composed of a few dozen “citizen leaders” who come together in monthly Solution Sessions to search for successful policies at work in other communities and propose them for adoption in their own. Civic Trustees serve for a term of one to three years, and take a pledge to leave their city and their country better than they found them. The Citizens Campaign offers strategic advice and support on issues chosen by the Trustees.

=== Civics Education ===
The Citizens Campaign developed teaching tools in "Solutions Civics" which were adopted into the mandatory social studies curriculum in high schools in the New Jersey cities of Newark, Trenton, Plainfield and Perth Amboy in 2018. Professors at Rutgers University-Newark, Providence College, Thomas Edison State University, and the University of Pennsylvania also introduced Power Civics into their college courses.

== Current Projects ==
=== Citizen Leadership Centers ===
In 2020, The Citizens Campaign and Middlesex County College partnered to establish a Citizen Leadership Center. Professors at the college adopted the Citizen Power training manual and Power Civics© teaching tools into their undergraduate courses, and community members can access the training online through the college's continuing education program. A Civic Trust will be based at the Middlesex County College Perth Amboy Center, where students who have earned the Power Civics© certificate can put their training into practice. The Citizens Campaign also announced a contest for additional community colleges to partner in the establishment of Citizen Leadership Centers across the country.

=== Coronavirus Response Plan ===
In 2020, Civic Trusts introduced plans to expand Community Emergency Response Teams to confront the COVID-19 pandemic in their cities, by distributing masks, food, and quarantine kits to those in need and facilitating contact tracing through community connectors.

=== Change of Culture Police Reform ===
In 2020, in the wake of the murder of George Floyd in Minneapolis, Samantha Castro introduced proposals to create a culture change in policing. These proposals include Civilian Complaint Review Boards, improved de-escalation training, tying promotions and salary to use of force records, and the establishment of Citizens Public Safety Advisory Councils including youth leaders. Castro, wrote in an op-ed: "The murder of George Floyd, as for many of my Gen-Z peers, was the catalyst that baptized me into civic participation with a focus on reforming policing.."

== Past projects ==
=== Academy for Citizen Empowerment ===
The Academy for Citizen Empowerment, or ACE, is the educational arm of The Citizens Campaign, chaired by Michael Delli Carpini. Its focus is adult leadership training. The academy has developed a series of free classes on citizen engagement both online and live at several locations in New Jersey. The "Paths to Service" classes educate citizens on community leadership positions in the "power centers" of government (detailed below).

=== New Jersey Online News Resource Group ===
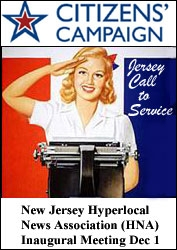
Flyer for the First HNA Meeting

The New Jersey Online News Resource Group, formally called the New Jersey Hyperlocal News Association. is a project facilitated by The Citizens Campaign which is dedicated to helping established and emerging hyperlocal news sites build their base, business, and brand, with a particular emphasis on best practices for covering local government and politics.

The coalition, chaired by Michael Delli Carpini, aims to assist hyperlocal editors, reporters, and citizen journalists ensure robust coverage of local government and politics. The Hyperlocal News Association has bi-monthly meetings with the aim of helping reporters, citizen journalists, and bloggers to learn about different aspects of covering local news and government. These meetings often include speakers or panels on important issues such as municipal budgets, political reform, and government transparency.

The association also provides:

- "Roadmap Stories", a guide on recurring political and governmental stories with recommendations on getting the story,
- an OPRA and Sunshine (reference to the Open Public Meetings Act, or OPMA) Call Center intended to help citizen journalists who have been denied access to public records,
- recruitment and training for citizen journalists,
- civic education articles to accompany feature stories advising how citizens can get engaged in the process and participate constructively.

In addition to facilitating the New Jersey Hyperlocal News Association, The Citizens Campaign owns PatersonPress.com, a hyperlocal news site for Paterson, New Jersey founded in October 2010. PatersonPress.com was recognized by the New Jersey Society of Professional Journalists with two first place awards for "Best Online Independent News Organization" and "Best Online Public Service". Joe Malinconico, editor of PatersonPress.com, was recognized for his coverage of Paterson's municipal budget process.

=== Pay to Play Reform ===
According to the chairman of The Citizens Campaign, Harry Pozycki, "pay-to-play is costing county and local governments throughout New Jersey hundreds of millions of dollars in higher fees for professionals and in unnecessary government contracts—costs that are passed on to New Jersey's property taxpayers." In response to this alleged corruption, The Citizens Campaign claim to have "developed and won adoption of the strongest State-Level Pay-to-Play Reform Law in the nation." In addition, they developed and won executive orders issued by Governor Jon Corzine further reforming pay-to-play across New Jersey.

The Campaign also developed model resolutions and ordinances to be used at the county and municipal levels. The ordinances, mostly proposed and adopted in towns, have met some opposition. At a Gloucester Township council meeting, the activist group South Jersey Citizens tried to enact pay to play reform, only to be met with stiff resistance from the local council. The local officials argued that this sort of legislation should be dealt with in the New Jersey State Legislature, rather than in each of the 566 municipalities of New Jersey. Unfortunately, SJC recognized, the New Jersey state legislature will not enact the much needed reforms at a state level and the individual local governing bodies are left to pass their own ordinances. As of May 2011, nearly 100 municipalities have adopted the ordinance already. Additionally, Pozycki believes that adoption of the ordinance in local government will help build momentum for a state reform package

The model pay-to-play reform legislation limits business entities seeking and performing certain government contracts from making political contributions to local campaign committees, municipal and county party committees, and certain political action committees (PACs).

=== Best price insurance contracting ===
In many municipalities of New Jersey, the municipality and school district pick a "broker of record" to solicit insurance company coverage quotes. These brokers are not paid by the municipality or school district, nor do they work for the governing body, but rather are paid a commission by the insurance company hired. The broker is paid based on a percentage of the cost of the overall package chosen. The Citizens Campaign drafted a model resolution to make this process more competitive and transparent. The resolution proposes several methods to remedy the current system:

- Provide incentives to brokers to work for the municipality's interest rather than the insurance company's
- Require brokers to be hired by the municipality or school district on a competitive, flat-fee basis
- Require municipalities and school districts to get multiple quotes, including bids from the State Health Benefits Plan and Joint Insurance Funds

In 2011 this legislation resulted in:

- $261,000 saved in brokers fees for Perth Amboy
- $37,000 saved in brokers fees for Morristown, New Jersey
- $1 million saved in brokers fees for the Toms River Regional Schools
- $3 million saved in the Perth Amboy Public Schools
- $2 million saved in the first year with a projected savings of $4 million in subsequent years in the Cherry Hill Public Schools

=== Party Democracy Act ===
In 2009 The Citizens Campaign won adoption of the Party Democracy Act (P.L. 2009, c. 135), legislation created by the Law and Policy Task Force, which amended the laws in Title 19 governing county political party committees. The Act had bipartisan sponsors: Senator Loretta Weinberg, Senator Diane Allen, Senator Linda Greenstein, and Assemblywoman Amy Handlin. The Act requires that each county political party have a constitution and bylaws which must be made available both on their website and their county board of election's website. The Act also requires that county political party committees use secret ballots when filling county and state legislative vacancies. Advanced notice of any such elections is required and all committeepersons must be given the opportunity to vote."

=== Citizen Service Act ===
In 2009, The Citizens Campaign won adoption of the Citizen Service Act (P.L. 2009, c. 141), legislation crafted by the Law and Policy Task Force, which requires all New Jersey municipalities to maintain a directory of boards and commissions, including membership, terms of office, and vacancies. The legislation had bipartisan sponsorship: Senator Jim Whelan, Senator Bill Baroni, Assemblyman Jack McKeon, and Assemblyman Joseph R. Malone.

== Other campaigns ==
- Shortly after the election of Cory Booker as mayor, Newark residents, with the support of The Citizens Campaign, successfully passed 7 out of 7 proposed reform ordinances. These ordinances included pay to play reform, developer disclosure of political contributions, open appointments to boards and commissions, a ban on fundraising on public property, creation of the position of inspector general, a ban on mayoral campaigns accepting employee contributions, and a ban on developers making major political contributions while seeking redevelopment approvals.
- With the help of The Citizens Campaign, citizens of Paterson, New Jersey were able to establish an Environmental Commission which, in turn, helped the city qualify for certification by Sustainable Jersey, a New Jersey environmental group. This certification makes Paterson eligible for grant funding and other support. Citizens also proposed a Best Price Insurance Contracting ordinance.
