= Player (political) =

A political player is a participant in politics who has or is perceived to have influence or power, although usually on a smaller level than a global power elite. The phrase may refer to an individual who is a candidate or elected or appointed official, but more commonly refers to someone who is not in office but still wields power or influence, such as a lobbyist, a fundraiser or contributor, a whistleblower, a political consultant, a labor union or labor leader, a corporation, or even an entire industry. More recently, with the rise of the Internet, web-based groups such as Moveon.org and online organizations, like ActBlue, have become political players as well.
