= RuneScape =

2001 video game

- Developer: Jagex
- Publisher: Jagex
- Designers: Andrew Gower; Paul Gower
- Composers: Ian Taylor; Adam Bond; James Hannigan
- Platforms: Browser; Linux; macOS; Windows; Android; iOS
- Release: 4 January 2001
- Genre: Massively multiplayer online role-playing game
- Mode: Multiplayer

RuneScape is a fantasy massively multiplayer online role-playing game (MMORPG) developed and published by Jagex. Created by Andrew Gower with assistance from his brother Paul Gower, it was first released on 4 January 2001 as a Java-based browser game; the original Java client was later largely replaced by the standalone C++ NXT client in 2016. The game is set in the medieval fantasy world of Gielinor, where players control customisable avatars and pursue open-ended activities such as questing, combat, skill training, trading, socialising, minigames and cooperative play.

Several major versions of RuneScape have been released. The original version became known as RuneScape Classic after the release of RuneScape 2 in 2004, while RuneScape 3, the third major iteration of the main game, was released in July 2013. Old School RuneScape, a separate game based on an August 2007 build, was released in February 2013 and is maintained alongside the main game. Old School RuneScape was released for iOS and Android in 2018; the main RuneScape game was released on Steam in 2020 and on iOS and Android in 2021.

RuneScape is recognised for its longevity and scale. Jagex has reported that more than 300 million accounts have been created for the franchise, and Guinness World Records has listed RuneScape as the MMO video game with the most users. By January 2026, RuneScape and Old School RuneScape had generated more than US$3 billion in lifetime revenue. The game has also drawn criticism over changes to trading, player-versus-player combat and microtransactions. In January 2026, Jagex removed the Treasure Hunter microtransaction system after a community vote.

== Gameplay ==
A screenshot of the game interface

RuneScape is an open-ended MMORPG set in Gielinor, a fantasy world in which players control customisable avatars. After introductory tutorial content, players may choose among activities such as training skills, fighting monsters, completing quests, trading with other players, including through the Grand Exchange marketplace, chatting, and taking part in minigames and other group activities.

Progression is organised largely through skills. Players gain experience points by performing actions associated with a skill, such as gathering resources, crafting items, fighting enemies, cooking food, or receiving quest rewards. Higher levels unlock new resources, equipment, abilities, areas, and other rewards. Some skills are available to free-to-play players, while others require membership. Skill levels and total levels are reflected in the game's high scores.

Combat involves attacking enemies, using abilities, and managing health and resources during encounters. Combat styles include Melee, Magic, Ranged and Necromancy. Melee, Magic and Ranged form a combat triangle in which each style has advantages and disadvantages against the others, while Necromancy, added in 2023, functions as a separate combat style. In 2012, Jagex released the Evolution of Combat update, which introduced ability-based combat and rebalanced the combat system. Legacy Mode, allowing players to use an older-style interface and combat system, was added in 2014. A 2026 combat modernisation update revised Melee, Magic and Ranged abilities and progression, including higher combat skill caps.

Player-versus-player combat has changed substantially over the game's history. The Wilderness historically served as the main open PvP area, but was restricted in 2007 as part of Jagex's efforts to combat real-world trading, restored in 2011 after a player referendum, and later reworked in 2022 into a primarily player-versus-monster area with optional PvP.

Quests provide structured storylines and rewards, often requiring particular skill levels, previous quest completion, or combat encounters. Rewards may include experience, items, access to new areas, quest points and other unlocks; players who complete all quests can obtain the Quest Point Cape.

== Development ==
Version history
1998	DeviousMUD
1999
2000
2001	RuneScape Classic
2002
2003
2004	RuneScape 2
2005
2006
2007
2008	RuneScape High Detail
2009
2010
2011
2012
2013	Old School RuneScape
2013	RuneScape 3

Andrew Gower developed RuneScape with the assistance of his brother Paul Gower. It was originally conceived as a text-based MUD, but graphics were added early in development, placing it among the games then described as "graphical MUDs". Starting in 1998, RuneScape was initially developed under the name DeviousMUD.

The first public version used a mixture of three-dimensional environments and two-dimensional sprites. It was released as a beta version on 4 January 2001 and initially operated from the Gower family's home in Nottingham. In December 2001, the Gower brothers and Constant Tedder formed Jagex to run the business side of the game. Among its early technologies, Jagex developed RuneScript, an interpreted domain-specific scripting language used by the game's server for event handling.

Ranged combat in RuneScape Classic

As the game grew, Jagex rewrote the engine for a new version with fully three-dimensional graphics called RuneScape 2. A beta version was released to paying members from 1 December 2003 until March 2004. Upon its official release, RuneScape 2 was renamed simply RuneScape, while the older version was kept online as RuneScape Classic. In January 2006, Jagex banned nearly 5,000 Classic accounts for cheating and restricted access to accounts that had recently played the game; additional reopenings occurred in 2009, 2010 and 2011. Jagex announced in May 2018 that RuneScape Classic would close because of accumulated bugs and incompatibility with the company's modern support tools. The servers were shut down on 6 August 2018.

Jagex displayed advertising above the game screen on free servers to support free-to-play access, and introduced a rule prohibiting advertisement blocking. In July 2006, Jagex signed an agreement with WildTangent to handle advertising around RuneScape in the United States and distribute the game through the WildTangent Games Network.

Jagex upgraded the game engine in May 2006 and released a high-detail mode in 2008. Language and regional versions followed, including German in 2007, French in 2008, Brazilian Portuguese in 2009 and Latin American Spanish in 2013. Jagex also pursued distribution partnerships outside the United Kingdom, including Zapak in India and Bigpoint in France and Germany.

In 2012, Jagex announced that an HTML5 version of RuneScape was in development for tablets, smart TVs and other platforms. The version was later branded RuneScape 3 and planned to use WebGL, a customisable user interface and improved audio. A closed beta of the HTML5 version began in April 2013, and RuneScape 3 was released on 22 July 2013. At RuneFest 2014, Jagex announced the C++ NXT client, intended to replace the Java client and the HTML5/WebGL client that had not progressed beyond beta, citing improved loading times, graphical effects and performance. After closed betas in February and March 2016, NXT was released publicly on 18 April 2016. RuneScape was released on Steam on 14 October 2020 and on iOS and Android on 16 June 2021.

=== Monetisation and microtransactions ===
RuneScape uses a free-to-play model, with paid membership and optional purchases. Jagex introduced a monthly membership service in February 2002, giving subscribers access to additional areas, quests and items.

In February 2012, Jagex introduced the Squeal of Fortune, a daily prize-wheel feature that used spins to award items. In April 2012, the company began selling additional spins for real money, introducing microtransactions tied to gameplay rewards. The change was criticised by players, partly because Jagex CEO Mark Gerhard had previously described microtransactions as "a stealth tax". Jagex added Solomon's General Store, a cosmetic shop using RuneCoins, in July 2012.

Jagex introduced bonds in September 2013. Bonds can be purchased with real currency, traded to other players, and redeemed for membership or other account benefits; Jagex presented them as a legitimate alternative to illicit real-world trading.

In February 2014, Squeal of Fortune was replaced by Treasure Hunter, in which players used keys to open reward chests. Treasure Hunter remained controversial because keys could be purchased with real money and rewards could affect progression; GameSpot later described the system as effectively a loot box mechanic. In November 2025, Jagex announced that Treasure Hunter would be removed after a community vote in which more than 120,000 votes supported its removal. Treasure Hunter was removed on 19 January 2026, alongside the removal from sale of 225 Direct XP and skilling-related items, as part of Jagex's 2026 integrity roadmap.

=== Graphics and audio ===
RuneScape has been updated through several client and engine generations. The first public version used a mixture of three-dimensional environments and two-dimensional sprites; RuneScape 2 introduced a fully three-dimensional engine in 2004, and a high-detail mode was released in 2008. An HTML5/WebGL client was announced for RuneScape 3, but Jagex later developed the standalone C++ NXT client to replace the Java client and HTML5 version that never left beta, citing improved loading times, graphical effects and performance. Players can run the game with different graphical settings, allowing higher-detail visuals on more powerful computers or lower-detail settings on less powerful systems.

RuneScape features a character-customisation system. Player characters are human, but players may choose the gender, hairstyle, facial hair, skin colour and clothing options. Appearance can also be changed by wearing or wielding items. Players can perform specialised animations called emotes, some of which are standard and others earned through gameplay or released during holiday events.

RuneScape has original music and ambient soundscapes. The music was designed to define the cultures of the game's locations, and ambient sounds occur in appropriate places, such as coastal areas. The game also incorporates voice acting in certain areas and situations. The game has a large original soundtrack. Early music was largely created with MIDI software; after the RuneScape 3 update, many newly released tracks used live studio recordings, including orchestral sessions recorded in Bratislava, Slovakia. James Hannigan also contributed orchestral music and arrangements to the game, while Old School RuneScape continues to use MIDI-style tracks. Guinness World Records recognised RuneScape for the most original pieces of music in a video game, including expansions, based on 1,198 tracks as of 25 July 2017.

=== Servers ===
RuneScape game servers are known as "worlds". Players can choose worlds manually, and some worlds are labelled for particular activities or communities. Worlds have historically been divided between free-to-play access and members-only access, with Jagex adding or moving worlds as demand and infrastructure needs change.

Each world has historically supported up to 2,000 simultaneous players.

=== Old School RuneScape ===
In February 2013, a poll was opened allowing players to decide whether Jagex should open a separate incarnation of RuneScape based on an August 2007 backup of the game. Old School RuneScape was opened to paying subscribers on 22 February 2013 after the poll received 50,000 votes, and a free-to-play version was released on 19 February 2015. It was originally created as an exact copy of RuneScape from August 2007 and has since received regular updates. Under the current Old School RuneScape polling charter, a feature poll is considered successful if it receives more than 70% yes votes, while bug fixes, integrity changes and some balancing changes are not polled. On 17 July 2017, Jagex announced a mobile port of Old School RuneScape, which was released in 2018.

=== DarkScape ===
On 16 September 2015, Jagex released DarkScape, a separate version of RuneScape which featured open-world player versus player combat. DarkScape was originally released with most of RuneScape's content, but received separate content updates. DarkScape was completely free to play, with some additional benefits reserved for paying subscribers. DarkScape closed on 28 March 2016 due to lack of interest.

=== Sequel ===
In October 2026, Runescape 4 was confirmed to be in development.

== Community ==
Jagex has maintained several community channels and activities over the game's history, including website forums, player-submitted artwork and seasonal events. The official RuneScape forums, formerly used for player discussion and other community activity, were shut down on 28 March 2024.

Players have also created independent fansites and wikis devoted to the game. The RuneScape Wiki originated as a player-created wiki in April 2005. Jagex has historically discouraged the sharing of web addresses in-game for account-security reasons.

Seasonal events have been held for holidays such as Easter, Halloween and Christmas. Early holiday items became tradeable collectibles, while later event rewards were generally made untradeable and limited to one per player.

== Rules and cheating ==
Jagex has maintained rules against player misconduct, bug abuse, the use of automation software, a practice known as macroing or botting, and real-world trading of game items or currency. Players who repeatedly break the rules may be temporarily or permanently banned.

In late 2007, Jagex released a series of anti-real-world-trading updates that restricted unbalanced trades and removed player-versus-player combat from the Wilderness. The changes also introduced the Grand Exchange and other systems intended to limit the transfer of gold and items between real-world traders and buyers. Free trade and Wilderness PvP were restored on 1 February 2011 after a player referendum.

On 25 October 2011, Jagex released an anti-bot update code-named ClusterFlutterer, nicknamed the "Bot Nuke". PC Gamer reported that Jagex estimated the update had removed 98% of bot accounts and banned 1.5 million bots in one day; Guinness World Records later listed the event as the most bots banned in a week, at 7.7 million bots. In 2012, Jagex introduced Botany Bay, a feature that sent botting offenders to an isolated area where other players could vote on their punishment before the accounts were banned; it was removed in 2018.

=== Notable bugs ===
The Falador Massacre was a bug that occurred on 6 June 2006 after the release of the Construction skill. The bug allowed some players to retain player-versus-player combat privileges after leaving a player-owned house, enabling attacks in areas where PvP combat was normally not permitted. The event was later commemorated by Jagex, and PC Gamer described it as one of the best-known bugs in MMO history.

== Reception ==
PC Gamer UK stated in December 2003, that while the "traditional [role-playing game] values of questing, slaying monsters and developing your character in a familiar medieval setting" will not "have the big boys trembling in their +2 Boots of Subscriber Gathering," this is offset by the game's accessibility through a web browser, "compounded by a version of the game that allows free adventuring player the opportunity to upgrade to a members' account", describing the game as "an unsurprising success".

The Yahoo! 2006 Buzz Log stated that, "while it may not be as easy on the eyes as some other popular [MMORPGs], like World of Warcraft, City of Heroes, or EverQuest, RuneScape is still a lot better way to kill time than pushing around cells in a spreadsheet". A 2007 JustRPG review summarised RuneScape as "a fun, addictive game, and while the graphics may not be perfect, for a game written in Java, they aren't bad. The skills are varied, the community is alright, and it'll eat up your time if you aren't careful", giving it a score of 83%.

In its 2008 intellectual property profile of the game, Developmag.com stated that whilst Jagex's changes to curtail real world trading resulted in "a wave of user criticism... growth is understood to have resumed since". Its analysis stated that "RuneScape's mass-market appeal lies in its simplicity and accessibility (both financial and technical). It has tapped into the vast market of games players unwilling or unable to spend premium prices on PCs capable of playing the latest, expensive, processor-intensive games. Its core gameplay concepts are very similar to its retail-distributed RPG and MMORPG analogues." In August 2008, RuneScape was recognised by the Guinness World Records as the world's most popular free MMORPG. Jagex was presented with a certificate to commemorate the achievement at the 2008 Leipzig Games Convention. A 2009 Eurogamer article criticised RuneScape's in-game community for being unfriendly to newcomers, although they have stated that the fan-forum community is more approachable.

An April 2011 review by MMORPG.com was complimentary of RuneScape, stating that "For anyone looking for that "old-school" experience but with also tons of progression, refinement, and unique ideas, RuneScape is easily recommendable", but criticised the game's combat system and emphasis on grinding. "...the genre feels slightly passed clicking an enemy and watching two swords clunk mercilessly into opposing body forms...RuneScape has grind in abundance and while this is not entirely a bad thing, it will put some players off looking for a slightly easier and more casual experience". The game received the "Role-Playing Game" award at The Independent Game Developers' Association Awards 2018.

On 10 December 2007, updates by Jagex removed free player-versus-player combat and unbalanced trading in order to rid the game of activities involving real currency being traded for virtual goods. The updates also affected legitimate players, resulting in many of them actively complaining on the forums. Jagex issued a Customer Support News article admitting the updates may not have been an ideal replacement for what was removed, requesting patience and promising to remedy potential problems with updates in the future. During the changes, subscription numbers fell by 60,000. No figures were given as to how many of those subscriptions belonged to legitimate players and how many to gold farmers. In an interview in February 2008, Jagex's head of content stated that, "we were really afraid we were going to lose our members over this change, because other games had in the past. But we are very, very pleased to say that we have lost practically none of our members."

In December 2010, a referendum was opened to decide whether to restore unbalanced trades and player-versus-player combat in the Wilderness, which closed with 1.2 million votes cast and 91% of voters in favour of the proposal, and these features were restored on 1 February 2011. A second referendum was announced in February 2013 to decide whether to run a separate version of the game dating from 2007, closing on 1 March 2013 with almost 450,000 votes. Servers for the 2007 version were opened on 22 February 2013 once 50,000 votes were collected.

== Commercial performance ==
In 2018, GamesIndustry.biz reported that RuneScape had generated more than US$1 billion in revenue since launch. A 2021 BusinessCloud profile said Jagex generated more than £100 million in annual revenue and more than £50 million in profit. In January 2026, Game Developer reported, citing Ukie, that RuneScape and Old School RuneScape had generated more than US$3 billion in lifetime revenue.

== Spin-off game ==
RuneScape: Dragonwilds is an open-world survival crafting spin-off developed by Jagex and set in the RuneScape universe. It entered Steam Early Access on 15 April 2025. It is scheduled to leave early access and launch in full on 15 September 2026 for PC, PlayStation 5, Xbox Series X/S, and Nintendo Switch 2.

== See also ==
- Brighter Shores
- MapleStory
