= Ideal Maniac =

Maniac
- Developer(s): Ideal Toy Company
- Publisher(s): Ideal Toy Company
- Release: 1979

Maniac is an electronic game created by Ralph H. Baer (the inventor of Simon), and released by the Ideal Toy Company.

Maniac is "four games in one". Instructions refer to the individual games as challenges.

In the first Challenge, Musical Maniac, Maniac plays random tones and then suddenly stops. The first player to hit their paddle gets 2 points, the second player gets a point. Anyone else gets 0.

In Challenge #2, Sounds Abound, Maniac plays a series of random tones of varying speed and pitch. The players must count the tones. When done, Maniac starts beeping. When the number of beeps equal the number of tones, players hit their paddles. Again, if you get the correct number you get 2 points, if you are the second you get a point, otherwise you get the 0.

In Challenge #3, Look Twice, Maniac beeps and lights in a seemingly random pattern, then displays three more patterns (one of which may or may not match the original). If the original pattern is repeated... hit that paddle. The 2 points, one point, zero points are awarded as before.

In Challenge #4, Your Time Is Up, Maniac plays a constant high pitched tone for a length of time. When the tone stops, players must hold down their paddle for the same length of time... whoever is closest gets the 2 points... etc.

Each game is repeated three times before moving on to the next. If nobody has won the game, it repeats the rounds in order.

The first player to get 25 points wins.
