= Brain Warp =

Electronic audio game

Brain Warp v3.0 (released: 2002)

Brain Warp is an electronic audio game which prototypes were invented by Big Monster Toys, and its final game production was manufactured and published by Tiger Electronics and released on June 16, 1996. In this game, players follow the spoken instructions from sound files spoken from the game unit. The player has to rotate the game in different directions so that the correct color is facing upwards. Its catchphrase which the voice says before a game begins is: "If you don't keep up with me, you're finished!". When you fail a game, the game unit will say "this game is finished" and then it will say "wanna warp again?". A Star Wars version titled Death Star Escape was released by Tiger Electronics in 1997 and the games are called Challenges.

== Overview ==
The spherical unit has six colored knobs – purple, red, green, white, orange and yellow – with numbers on them, and a blue base. A second version was released in 2002 with a translucent black base. The voice calls out a color, a number, or both, depending on the game selected, and the player flips the unit so that the correct knob is facing upwards. After every four points, the game becomes faster. If the player responds incorrectly, the round is ended and the unit will make a raspberry sound. There are six games in total – three where the player has to follow the command, one memory game that uses a combination of colors and numbers, a code buster game and a game called Pass Attack where players have to make up their own pattern. When the game has finished, the electronic unit will say "This game is finished!" After a pause, the game will encourage the player to play the game again by saying "Wanna warp again?" In Brain Warp, the player can select between one of the six different games. The Star Wars version is grey and each knob has the same colors from Brain Warp but has a Star Wars character which include:

1. Luke Skywalker
2. Princess Leia
3. C-3PO
4. R2-D2
5. Chewbacca
6. Han Solo

In 2007, a follow-up to Brain Warp was released by Hasbro called Hyperslide which features the Code Buster game from Brain Warp and has four discs which all have a different color.

== Games ==
| Game number | Game name | Game description |
|---|---|---|
| 1 | Colors | The voice calls out colors and the player has to flip the unit to get the correct color to face upwards before time expires. In the Star Wars version, Challenge One is called Meltdown. The player has 30 seconds to see how many times the player can repeat the sequence. There are three rounds. Each round adds an extra Star Wars character. |
| 2 | Numbers | Same as Game One, but the numbers on the unit are used. Challenge Two in the Star Wars version is called Prove Yourself. In this game, each player is given a Star Wars character, and a random player is selected to complete the sequence. |
| 3 | Combo | The unit can command either colors or numbers. Same as Game One. Challenge Three in the Star Wars version is called Blow Up. It is very similar to the Code Buster in Brain Warp, but the same number of points are earned for each code that has been found. e.g.: Round 1 is worth 5 points. Player finds the 5 number code. Round 2 is for 6 points, etc. |
| 4 | Memory Match | The unit calls a sequence of colors and/or numbers, and the player has to do all of them in the correct order. In the Star Wars version, Challenge Four is called Chain Reaction. It is identical to the Pass Attack game in Brain Warp. |
| 5 | Code Buster | Through trial and error, players have to find the secret code of 5 or more colors within 60 seconds. The unit always orally gives the first code. Challenge Five in the Star Wars Brain Warp is called Names. It is very similar to Colors in Brain Warp but there are no rounds and the player can score up to 99 points. |
| 6 | Pass Attack | Players create their own sequence of colors up to a maximum of 30. Each player has to complete the entire sequence before adding a color of their choice. A mistake or failure to add a new color eliminates a player. In the Star Wars version, Challenge Six is called Names and Numbers. It is very similar to Combo in Brain Warp but there are no rounds and the player can score up to 99 points. |

== History ==
The game was the most popular in Duracell's Kids' Choice National Toy Survey in 1996.

The toy can be seen in many episodes of 3rd Rock from the Sun in Dick's office area.

=== Trivia ===
During the manufacturing process, there were some units of Brain Warp that contained an earlier revision of the game, which can be called version 1.0 or version 2.0. The 2.0 version was able to work better with faster speeds between 36 and 44 points on the three reflex games, Colors, Numbers and Combo than the original 1.0 version. The newer 2.0 version has a green arrow on the bottom of the brain warp logo on the purple knob. The older 1.0 version also had some unused voice files in the demo/test mode such as "You're the champ!" "Almost!" "Better luck next time!" and "Nice try!" and had a different background music compared to the newer 2.0 version. Also, there was a bug in the older 1.0 version that lead to the voice and sound effects not in the right pitch against the music. This also happened with Hasbro's Bop It Extreme and Tiger's Boogey Ball game. the newer 2.0 version does not respond best to fast movements. You can get 44 points easier on a 1.0 and beat the game. So if you want to buy a Brain Warp 1.0, look for the one with a green arrow on the bottom of the logo on the purple knob and one with a blue arrow on the logo for a 2.0. To access the test mode in Brain Warp, one must detach the yellow/six knob containing the batteries, move the yellow cover while holding the unit with the purple/one knob (1..0 with green arrow on bottom of logo or 2.0 with the blue arrow on bottom of logo) facing the upwards position, and then pressing the button.

== Brain Shift ==
The Brain Shift toy

On September 6, 1998, Tiger Electronics released a sister game to Brain Warp, a tabletop electronic audio game called Brain Shift featuring a stick shift for game input. Players move a 'stick shift' to respond to voice commands and sound patterns. In certain game modes, the game becomes increasingly fast. The game requires close attention, and teaches children to recognize and replicate patterns. It came second in the 1998 Duracell Kids' Choice National Toy Survey, and gained a "Seal of Approval" from the US-based National Parenting Center. The hype around the release by Tiger Electronics of the Furby at the same time allowed the company to concentrate its marketing on Brain Shift. This game has two different versions of introduction. It either says "Okay, listen up" or "Alright!" followed by its catchphrase, "Get your brain in gear and let's play Brain Shift." This game has six colors: red, green, yellow, blue, orange and white. The game will then say "Now choose your game". There are six different games: After choosing a game, the voice will then say "Now how many shifters do we have?" The number of players will be selected and then the game will give a short explanation of how the game is played and then the game will commence.

The commercial of the game was made by New York advertising agency Posnik and Kolker whilst Tiger Electronics provided the voice talent for the game and the commercial.

| Game number | Game name | Game description |
|---|---|---|
| 1 | Stick Shift | A melody starts playing in the background and the electronic unit announces whose turn it is to play. e.g.: "One shift." Then, the colors are called out at random. On the first course of commands, the player scores one point on the two shift pattern. Afterwards, they earn one point on every deep voice. The background music speed increases once a round is completed. The music continues to get faster until the speed of the game becomes impossible for the player. The game keeps on going until the player either runs out of time or makes a mistake. The game is known to have a very short timer so that it makes the player lose at a certain point in the game. Around level 14, It becomes so fast that the player has to shift to the correct color whilst the sound file is playing. Some colors like green, yellow, red and blue have the shortest hesitation time. The maximum score in all games on Brain Shift is 20 Shifts. A shift equals to a number of colours the player has managed to shift. |
| 2 | Memory Shift | This is similar to Memory Match in Brain Warp but only 2-4 players can play. In this game, only the deep voice is used to call out the colors. The game starts off with three colors and increases on completing the round. If all players crash, the round is repeated. |
| 3 | Who Shifts It? | Similar to Memory Shift, but a random player is selected. |
| 4 | Ear Shift | This game is for 1-4 players. The unit gives a random sequence of vehicle sounds. The player has to shift all six sounds in order to win the game. |
| 5 | Secret Shift | Through trial and error, players have to find the secret code of 5 or more colors within 60 seconds. The unit always orally gives the first code. It is very similar to Code Buster in Brain Warp but at the end of the game, the shift pattern is revealed. |
| 6 | Shift Around | This game is for 2-4 players. create their own sequence of colors up to a maximum of 20 Shifts. Each player has to complete the entire sequence before adding a color of their choice. A mistake or failure to add a new color eliminates a player. Like other multiplayer games in Brain Shift, if all players are out, the round is repeated. |

Some units of Brain Shift had a 'Tiger recommends Duracell' sticker attached to where the batteries are inserted. All sealed units had the stickers on the back of the packaging. This was because at that time, Tiger was allowed to promote Duracell batteries on their games. If the user press 'on' and 'pause' buttons on the front of the device and inserts one of the top right, bottom left and bottom right battery whilst there are three batteries in the unit, the game will enter test mode and play Happy Birthday To You using the sound that plays the melody during the game. Each color on the test mode will test different functions of the game. If the 'pause' button is pressed whilst in test mode, the user will be able to test the stick shift and the game will say the number followed by the colour. Also, the game has an intelligent voice announcement system that tells the player who is out and who wins in a multiplayer game with 2-4 shifters playing.

Some units of Brain Shift glitch on low batteries depending on what electronics are operating the unit. It will cut out several parts of the audio file with either some background distortion, or in a very rare instance, the voice will try to say "You shift" but doesn't say the whole phrase properly. There will also be small crackling sounds whilst the lights are flashing. As the batteries get lower, some Brain Shift units have been known to lose their memory and start counting random players who are considered 'out' of the game or have crashed. The counting will max out at number 69 and eventually mix with the colors. There have been some units that are manufactured at different pitch ranging from two semitones lower to two semi-tones higher than its normal pitch. This is due to the setting of the clock speed inside the circuit board that affects the speed and pitch of the game.

In 2017, a replica of the game was being made by a team of Freelancers who published the game without the project manager's permission on the Google Play store. The project manager has been working with other freelancers to make a bug-free build with a new version (version 1.01) and will be released to iOS once it is ready. Since 2021, the version of Mob Shift have increased to version 2.2 on the Itch store for PC which has a new Female voice. A new version is in development that involves freelancers developing the game.

In June 2018, the iOS version of Mob Shift version 1.03 was released. The project manager says that there are only two more versions of Mob Shift left to update for all platforms, 1.04 and 2.0. In version 1.04, all known audio issues will be fixed and will include a quit button for the PC and Mac builds. For version 2.0, it will be the biggest update which will include better scripting for the game with a new design and a new male voice. In November 2018, the Android version of Mob Shift developed by DO PLAY was removed due to a copyright issue submitted to Google by Samtastic Games. The most genuine version of Mob Shift is version 1.04 available on the iTunes Store. A final version 2.0 is expected to be released in 2019 developed by 3rdeyes Infotech. In Unity, this is project 3.0 as there was a 2.0 in development but it eventually got scrapped and the project manager decided not to spend any more money on it. In 2020, version 2.1 of Mob Shift will be released towards the end of July with a new game mode called Number Shift. The game was released for Windows on July 16, 2020, for Windows and will be released for Mac, iOS and Android later. In 2022, the app Mob Shift was removed from the App Store due to lack of software updates. The developer behind the app said that they have plans to re-launch the app titled Brain Shift The Game with new code and graphics and it will feature a voice that can perfectly emulate the original.

== Brain Bash ==
The first game from the Brain Family was released in 1994 by Tiger called Brain Bash. The game has four purple buttons and four yellow buttons. The game has five games that play in order. Games 1 and 2 are command games - game 1 tells the player to touch the purple player button followed by the numbered yellow button (e.g.: one touch one) and game 2 commands the player to press the button through direction (e.g.: one touch right). Games 3-5 are math games where the game will give an equation that totals to a maximum of 4 and a minimum of 1.

== Catchphrases ==
Each Tiger Electronics brain game has several catchphrases including:

Brain Bash

- "Let's play Brain Bash! (On turning the game unit on)
- Let's play next game (on finishing a game/level of a game)
- "Player N is winning with N points"
- "Nice going!"
- "You goofed!"
- "Come on!"

Brain Warp

- "Get ready to play Brain Warp. Select game."
- "Follow my commands."
- "If you don't keep up with me, you're finished!"
- "This game is finished!"
- "Wanna warp again?"
- "Player N wins with N points." (and variants thereof)
- "You broke the code!" (upon successfully completing a round of "Code Buster")

Star Wars Version

- "If you're ready to be tested by the Death Star, select your challenge."
- "You must be paced with my commands."
- "You have survived and destroyed the Death Star. You win!"
- "One of you will be chosen to prove yourself."
- "May the force be with you."
- "Challenger N wins with N points."
- "This battle is done."

Brain Shift

- "Alright! Get your brain in gear and let's play Brain Shift!"
- "OK, listen up. Get your brain in gear and let's play Brain Shift!"
- "Now choose your game."
- "Now how many shifters do we have?"
- "Sorry, Player N, you're out!"
- "Sorry, Player N, should've been (color)."
- "Sorry, Player N, should've been (color). You're out!"
- "You all crashed, OK. Repeat that round again."
- "You shift what I call."
- "Remember the pattern, then shift it."
- "Start on (color)."
- "Find the secret shift pattern. You have sixty seconds to shift it or you crash."
- "Remember the location of the six sounds. Shift all six and win."
- "Sorry, player one, you crashed! You have N shifts."
- "You completed N shifts in N seconds."
- "Now find the pattern of N shifts. Start on (color)!"
- "Player N wins."
- "Player N, you win with N shifts."
- "This game is over."

== See also ==
- Bop It
- Simon (game)
