= Electronic game =

Interactive game that employs electronics

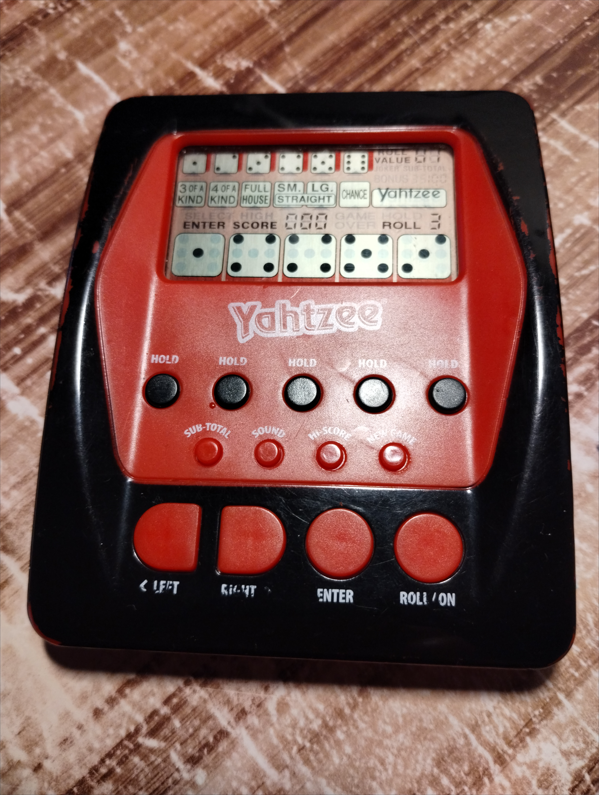
An LCD screen Yahtzee game

An electronic game is a game that uses electronics to create an interactive system with which a player can play. Video games are the most common form today, and for this reason the two terms are often used interchangeably. There are other common forms of electronic games, including handheld electronic games, standalone arcade game systems (e.g. pinball, slot machines), and exclusively non-visual products (e.g. audio games).

== Arcade games ==
=== Arcade video games ===
Electronic video arcade games make extensive use of solid state electronics and integrated circuits. In the past coin-operated arcade video games generally used custom per-game hardware often with multiple CPUs, highly specialized sound and graphics chips and/or boards, and the latest in computer graphics display technology. Recent arcade game hardware is often based on modified video game console hardware or high end pc components. Arcade games may feature specialized ambiance or control accessories, including fully enclosed dynamic cabinets with force feedback controls, dedicated lightguns, rear-projection displays, reproductions of car or plane cockpits and even motorcycle or horse-shaped controllers, or even highly dedicated controllers such as dancing mats and fishing rods. These accessories are usually what set modern arcade games apart from PC or console games, and they provide an experience that some gamers consider more immersive and realistic.

Examples of arcade video games include:

- Galaxy Game (1971)
- Pong (1972)
- Space Invaders (1978)
- Galaxian (1979)
- Pac-Man (1980)
- Battlezone (1980)
- Donkey Kong (1981)
- Street Fighter II (1991)
- Mortal Kombat (1992)
- Fatal Fury (1992)
- Killer Instinct (1994)
- King of Fighters (1994–2005)
- Time Crisis (1995)
- Dance Dance Revolution (1998)
- DrumMania (1999)
- House of the Dead (1998)

=== Pinball and pachinko machines ===
Since the introduction of electromechanics to the pinball machine in 1933's Contact, pinball has become increasingly dependent on electronics as a means to keep score on the backglass and to provide quick impulses on the playfield (as with bumpers and flippers) for exciting gameplay. Unlike games with electronic visual displays, pinball has retained a physical display that is viewed on a table through glass. Similar games such as pachinko have also become increasingly dependent on electronics in modern times.

Examples of pinball games include:

- The Addams Family (1991)
- Indiana Jones: The Pinball Adventure (1993)
- Star Trek: The Next Generation (1993)
- List of pinball machines

=== Redemption games and merchandisers ===
Redemption games such as Skee-Ball have been around since the days of the carnival game - well earlier than the development of the electronic game, however with modern advances many of these games have been re-worked to employ electronic scoring and other game mechanics. The use of electronic scoring mechanisms has allowed carnival or arcade attendants to take a more passive role, simply exchanging prizes for electronically dispensed coupons and occasionally emptying out the coin boxes or banknote acceptors of the more popular games.

Merchandisers such as the Claw Crane are more recent electronic games in which the player must accomplish a seemingly simple task (e.g. remotely controlling a mechanical arm) with sufficient ability to earn a reward.

Examples of redemption games include:

- Whac-A-Mole (1976)
- Skee-Ball - modern electric versions

Examples of merchandisers include:

- Claw crane (1980)

=== Slot machines ===
The slot machine is a casino gambling machine with three or more reels which spin when a button is pushed. Though slot machines were originally operated mechanically by a lever on the side of the machine (the one arm) instead of an electronic button on the front panel as used on today's models, many modern machines still have a "legacy lever" in addition to the button on the front. Slot machines include a currency detector that validates the coin or money inserted to play. The machine pays off based on patterns of symbols visible on the front of the machine when it stops. Modern computer technology has resulted in many variations on the slot machine concept.

== Audio games ==
An audio game is a game played on an electronic device such as—but not limited to—a personal computer. It is similar to a video game save that the only feedback device is audible rather than visual. Audio games originally started out as 'blind accessible'-games, but recent interest in audio games has come from sound artists, game accessibility researchers, mobile game developers, and mainstream video gamers. Most audio games run on a computer platform, although there are a few audio games for handhelds and video game consoles. Audio games feature the same variety of genres as video games, such as adventure games, racing games, etc.

Examples of audio games include:

- Real Sound: Kaze no Regret (1997)
- Chillingham (2004)
- BBBeat (2005)

=== Tabletop games ===
A tabletop audio game is an audio game that is designed to be played on a table rather than a handheld game.

Examples of tabletop audio games include:

- Brain Shift (1998)
- Who Wants to be a Millionaire? (2000)
- Electronic Battleship (1977) (Milton Bradley)
  - Electronic battleship is a portable game with the objective of marking all enemy ships. When an enemy ship is marked, an electronic battleship makes an explosion sound.
  - Milton Bradley created the Electronic battleship game in 1977 and was later acquired by Hasbro in 1984.
  - Modern day electronic battleship features an interactive missile launching platform and advanced mode that features custom special attack pegs.

Tabletop non-audio games include:

- Electronic Chess Boards (DGT)
- DGT is a line of electronic chess boards that are commonly used in FIDE chess tournaments and national tournaments such as USCF. Electronic Chess boards can be used to broadcast games live.

== Electronic handhelds ==
The earliest form of dedicated console, handheld electronic games are characterized by their size and portability. Used to play interactive games, handheld electronic games are often miniaturized versions of video games. The controls, display and speakers are all part of a single unit, and rather than a general-purpose screen made up of a grid of small pixels, they usually have custom displays designed to play one game. This simplicity means they can be made as small as a digital watch, which they sometimes are. The visual output of these games can range from a few small light bulbs or LED lights to calculator-like alphanumerical screens; later these were mostly displaced by liquid crystal and Vacuum fluorescent display screens with detailed images and in the case of VFD games, color. Handhelds were at their most popular from the late 1970s into the early 1990s. They are both the predecessors to and inexpensive alternatives to the handheld game console.

Examples of handheld electronic games include:

- Mattel Auto Race (1976)
- Simon (1978)
- Merlin (1978)
- Game & Watch (1980)
- MB Omni (1980)
- Bandai LCD Solarpower (1982)
- Entex Adventure Vision (1982)
- Lights Out (1995)

== Home video games ==
A video game is a game that involves interaction with a user interface to generate visual feedback on a video device. The word video in video game traditionally referred to a raster display device. However, with the popular use of the term "video game", it now implies any type of display device.

Term "digital game" has been offered by some in academia as an alternative term.

=== Computer games ===
A personal computer video game (also known as a computer game or simply PC game) is a video game played on a personal computer. This is opposed to video game consoles or arcade machines, which are not considered personal computers. Computer games became a form of video games, and since the earliest days of the medium, visual displays such as the cathode-ray tube have been used to relay game information.

=== Console games ===
A console game is a form of interactive multimedia used for entertainment. The game consists of manipulable images (and usually sounds) generated by a video game console, and displayed on a television or similar audio-video system. The game itself is usually controlled and manipulated using a handheld device connected to the console called a controller. The controller generally contains a number of buttons and directional controls (such as analog joysticks) each of which has been assigned a purpose for interacting with and controlling the images on the screen. The display, speakers, console, and controls of a console can also be incorporated into one small object known as a handheld game console.

Console games are most frequently differentiated between by their compatibility with consoles belonging in the following categories:

- Traditional console, also called "home console" - A multi-game system that uses the screen of a television to produce graphics.
- Handheld game console - A multi-game system the screen and controls of which are compacted into a single handheld device.
- Dedicated console - A (typically) single game system of either the Plug and play variety or the LCD game.

== Hybrid or combined games ==
Game hybridization refers to the integration of an interactive, electronic component into a game. A "hybrid" or "combined game" is any tabletop game where an electronic device and/or application is an element crucial to the gameplay. These games are a catalyst for creating new game mechanics. Important consequences of this technology are: the possible substitution of the gamemaster or person who leads a game for an application or device, which can be more fair, with less room for bias, cheating or favouritism, and can be intelligently randomised; the possibility of using artificial intelligence and machine learning in games; greater randomisation of events; possibility of conducting fast and advanced mathematical calculations, making some complex games easier or available to a wider group of consumers; and enhanced player immersion with the aid of various stimuli like sound or animation.

One may categorize hybrid games as follows:

- Purpose-built devices: Where the game uses a device that has certain functions (like an electronic dice or spinner) to play out the game. An example would be "Monopoly: Electronic Banking" (2007) by Hasbro, where all players have an electronic card which carries virtual Monopoly currency, and use a machine to increase and deduct their earnings.
- Beacon technology games are mobile, digital games that employ BLE (Bluetooth Low Energy) Beacons to track and control players movements and actions. An example: Artifact Technologies created a mobile, digital board game, called BattleKasters where players physically walk around to cast spells or unlock cards.
- Augmented Reality: board games that interact with a mobile device and immerse the player in the virtual environment through animation, sound and/or vibrations. Example: Roar! by Trefl, which utilises sound as part of the gameplay.

== Other games ==
Electronics have been adapted for use in a wide range of applications. Board games such as Dark Tower, for instance, rely heavily upon electronics. Non-traditional electronic games such as Rubik's Revolution or electronic toys which blur the boundaries between games and toys such as the Electronic Magic 8 Ball Date Ball or the Electronic Ouija Board are often considered electronic games as well.

=== Non-human games ===
With the development of technology geared toward electronic entertainment of animals (typically pets), video games for pets have also been created. Since the majority of animals lack opposable thumbs, the fine motor skills required for use in most gaming is unavailable to these animals. Furthermore, the visual perception of many animals is influenced by a different visible spectrum than humans. Techniques that de-emphasize manual control and visual components have been developed to circumvent these problems beginning with the development of television for pets. From this point, developers have branched out into the realm of electronic games with such products as Mice Arena (for mice), Chicken Petman, and CyberPounce (for cats).

== See also ==
Esports
