= Touch Me (arcade game) =

1974 arcade game

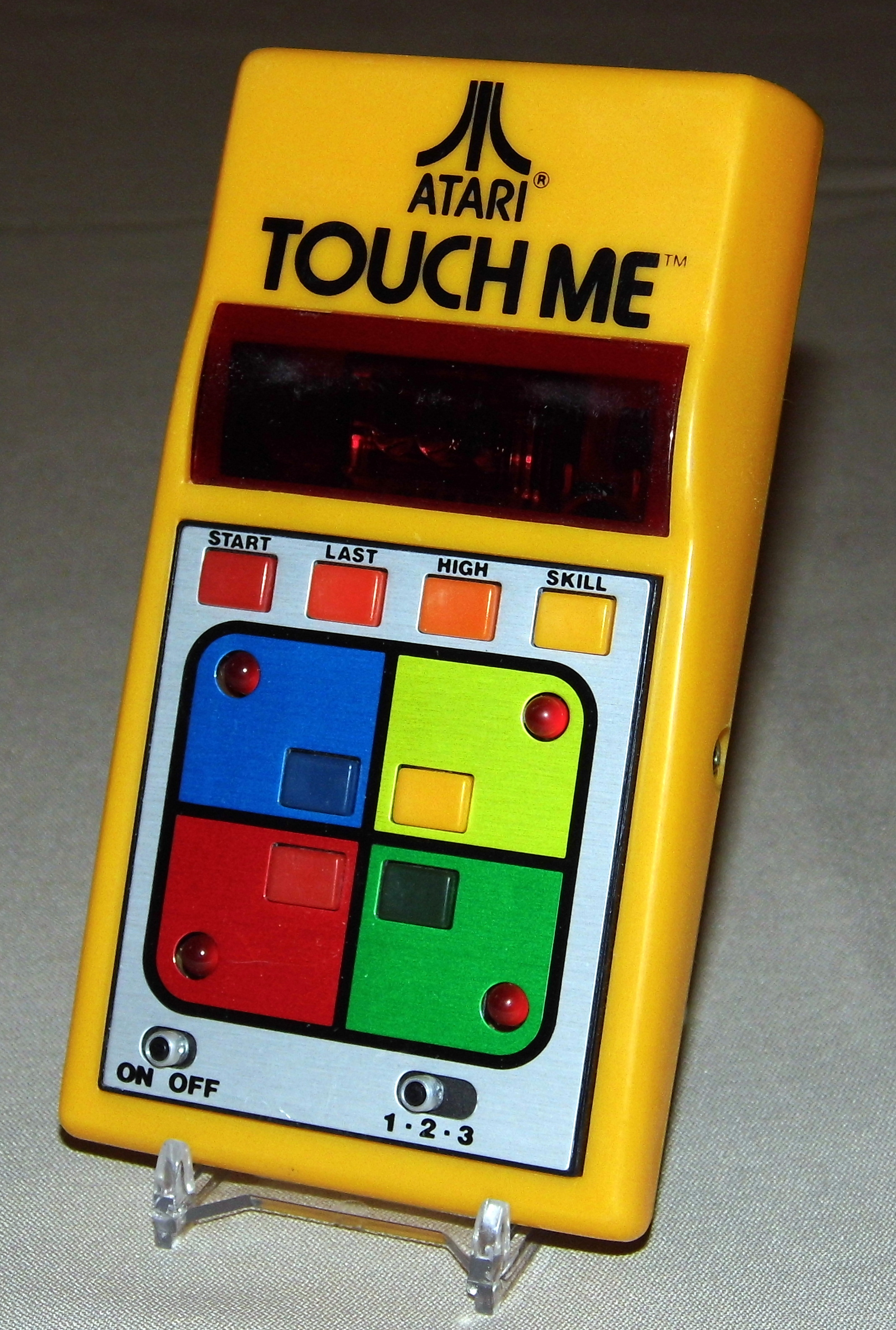
- Handheld version of Touch Me
- Publisher: Atari Inc.
- Platforms: Arcade, handheld console
- Release: 1974

Touch Me is an arcade game first released by Atari Inc. in 1974, and later as a handheld game in 1978. It can be described as a Simon Says-like game that involves touching a series of buttons that light up and produce sounds. The player must observe a sequence of blinking electric lights and repeat the sequence back in the same order that it occurred. Each time this is completed, the game will produce another sequence with an additional button added. This process is repeated and a digital score window displays the total number of sound sequences a player correctly repeats. The game continues until the maximum sequence of buttons is reached, or the user makes a mistake.

== History ==
Touch Me was first released as an arcade game in 1974 by Atari. The arcade version was housed in a short arcade cabinet and had four large circular buttons of the same color. The player was allowed to make three mistakes before the game ended. The arcade game found itself competing for attention in arcades with the latest pinball machines and video games of the day; it was not very successful.

In 1977, Ralph Baer saw potential in the "Simon Says" concept behind the Touch Me game. He copied Atari's game, adding colored buttons and musical sound effects, and created the Simon handheld game, which became a major success.

Seeing this, Atari sought to capitalize on the success of Simon and released their own handheld version of Touch Me in 1978.

An emulated handheld version of Touch Me was included in the 2022 compilation Atari 50.
