= Big Monster Toys =

American Toy Company

- Industry: Toys and entertainment
- Founded: May 1988
- Founders: Jeff Breslow; Howard Morrison; Rouben Terzian
- Headquarters: Chicago, IL
- Website: www.bmttoys.com

Big Monster Toys, LLC (BMT), established in May 1988, was a United States-based toy and game inventing and licensing company.

== History ==
Big Monster Toys was founded in 1988 by Jeff Breslow, Howard Morrison, and Rouben Terzian, three former partners of Marvin Glass & Associates. MGA was one of the pioneers of the post-World War II American toy industry. Breslow, Morrison, and Terzian teamed with two principal designers from MGA, Don Rosenwinkel and John Zaruba. Together, they formed Breslow Morrison Terzian & Associates" (the initial basis of the "BMT" acronym).

== About ==
Big Monster Toys was located in the West Loop of Chicago. The studio occupied roughly 18,000 square feet (1,700 m^{2}) of space for over 25 designers. Their facilities included an audio recording studio, a full machine shop, plastic molding, electronic design, software programming, 3D printing, a paint shop, exercise equipment, and a digital video authorship and editing facility.

Big Monster Toys invented and engineered toys from concept to prototype. BMT also helped to develop the marketing position, product name, packaging and promotional material for the toys. BMT licensed toys to companies throughout the world. Their clients included Mattel, Hasbro (and formerly Tiger Electronics), Moose, Spin Master, Goliath, Playmates Toys.

BMT won numerous industry awards, and was considered a positive supporter of toy invention and the toy industry. Breslow, Morrison, and Terzian were inducted into the Toy Industry Hall of Fame, in 1998, for their successful 31-year collaborative efforts.

On November 29, 2023, the company ceased all future operations and laid off its entire workforce. On December 28, 2023, partner Sam Unsicker confirmed that while the staff had been dismissed, the business remained operational for the purpose of collecting ongoing royalties.
