= Howard J. Morrison =

American game designer (1932–2025)

Howard J. Morrison (1932 – January 21, 2025) was an American game designer, who designed the game Simon with Ralph H. Baer while working for Marvin Glass at Marvin Glass and Associates.

With the closure of Marvin Glass and Associates, in 1988, Morrison and his partners Jeffrey Breslow and Roben Terzian went on to start the design firm Breslow, Morrison, Terzian & Associates (BMT; now 'Big Monster Toys,' and were subsequently inducted into the Toy Industry Association Hall of Fame in 1998.

He died on January 21, 2025, aged 92.
