= Ralph H. Baer =

American inventor and engineer (1922–2014)

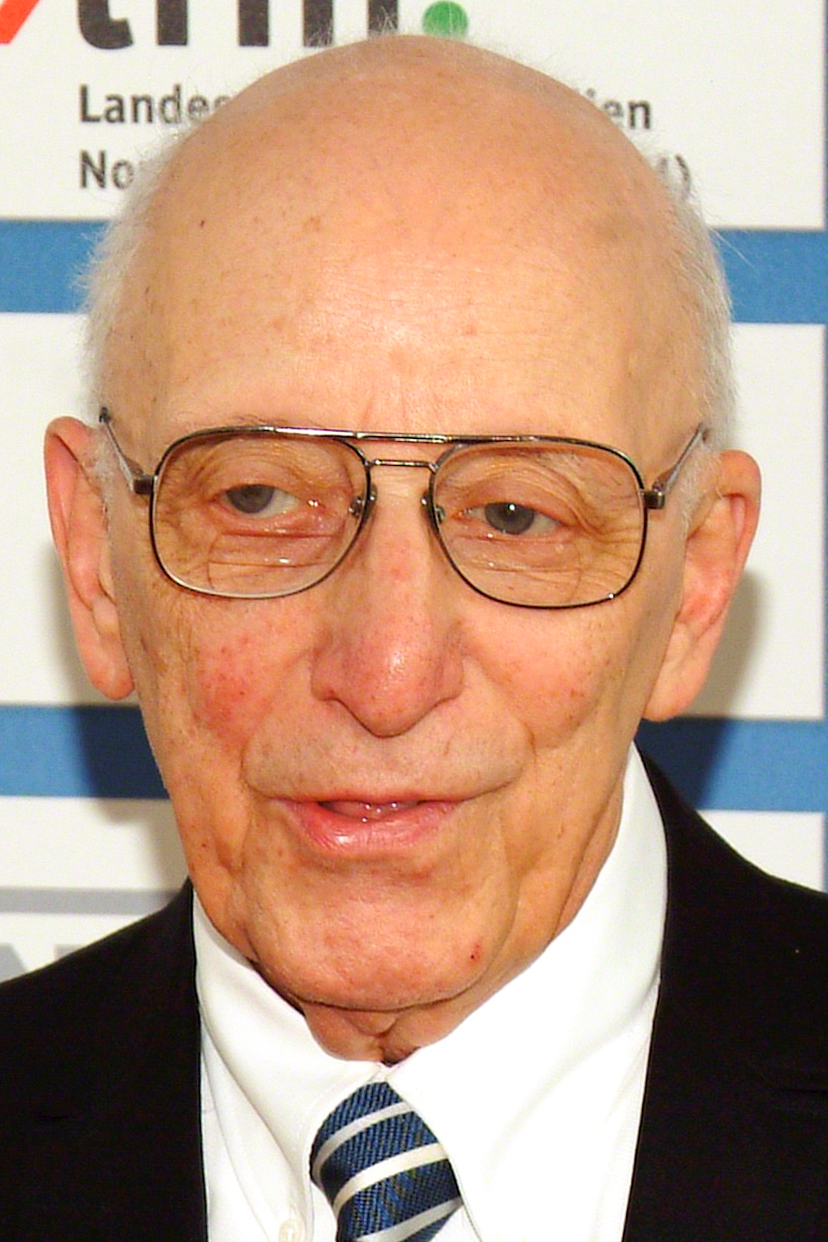
- Baer in 2009
- Born: Rudolf Heinrich Baer; March 8, 1922; Rodalben, Palatinate, Germany
- Died: December 6, 2014 (aged 92); Manchester, New Hampshire, U.S.
- Occupations: Inventor, video game designer, engineer
- Spouse: Dena Whinston (m. 1952; died 2006)
- Children: 3
- Website: www.ralphbaer.com

Ralph Henry Baer (born Rudolf Heinrich Baer; March 8, 1922 – December 6, 2014) was a German-born American inventor, game developer, and engineer.

Baer's Jewish family fled Germany just before World War II and Baer served the American war effort, gaining an interest in electronics shortly thereafter. Through several jobs in the electronics industry, he was working as an engineer at Sanders Associates (now BAE Systems) in Nashua, New Hampshire, when he conceived the idea of playing games on a television screen around 1966. With support of his employers, he worked through several prototypes until he arrived at a "Brown Box" that would later become the blueprint for the first home video game console, licensed by Magnavox as the Magnavox Odyssey. Baer continued to design several other consoles and computer game units, including contributing to design of the Simon electronic game. Baer continued to work in electronics until his death in 2014, with over 150 patents to his name.

Baer is considered "the Father of Video Games" due to his many contributions to games and helping to spark the video game industry in the latter half of the 20th century. In February 2006, he was awarded the National Medal of Technology for "his groundbreaking and pioneering creation, development and commercialization of interactive video games, which spawned related uses, applications, and mega-industries in both the entertainment and education realms".

== Early life and education ==
Baer was born in 1922 to Lotte (Kirschbaum) and Leo Baer, a Jewish family living in Germany, in Pirmasens, and was originally named Rudolf Heinrich Baer. At age 14, he was expelled from school due to anti-Jewish legislation implemented in Nazi Germany and had to go to an all-Jewish school. His father worked in a shoe factory in Pirmasens at the time. Baer's family, fearing increasing persecution, moved from Germany to New York City in 1938, just two months prior to Kristallnacht, while Baer was a teenager. Baer would later become a naturalized United States citizen.

== Career ==
In the United States, Baer was self-taught and worked in a factory for a weekly wage of twelve dollars. After seeing an advertisement at a bus station for education in the budding electronics field, he quit his job to study in the field. He graduated from the National Radio Institute as a radio service technician in 1940. In 1943 he was drafted to fight in World War II and assigned to military intelligence at the United States Army headquarters in London. On returning from war duty in 1946, he presented a large collection of weaponry he had amassed (about 18 short tons (16,000 kg)) to museums in Aberdeen, Maryland; Springfield, Massachusetts; and Fort Riley, Kansas. With his secondary education funded by the G.I. Bill, Baer graduated with a Bachelor of Science degree in Television Engineering, which was unique at the time, from the American Television Institute of Technology in Chicago in 1949.

In 1949, Baer went to work as chief engineer for a small electro-medical equipment firm called Wappler, Inc. There he designed and built surgical cutting machines, epilators, and low frequency pulse generating muscle-toning equipment. In 1951, Baer went to work as a senior engineer for Loral Electronics in Bronx, New York, where he designed power line carrier signaling equipment, contracting for IBM. From 1952 to 1956, he worked at Transitron, Inc., in New York City as a chief engineer and later as vice president.

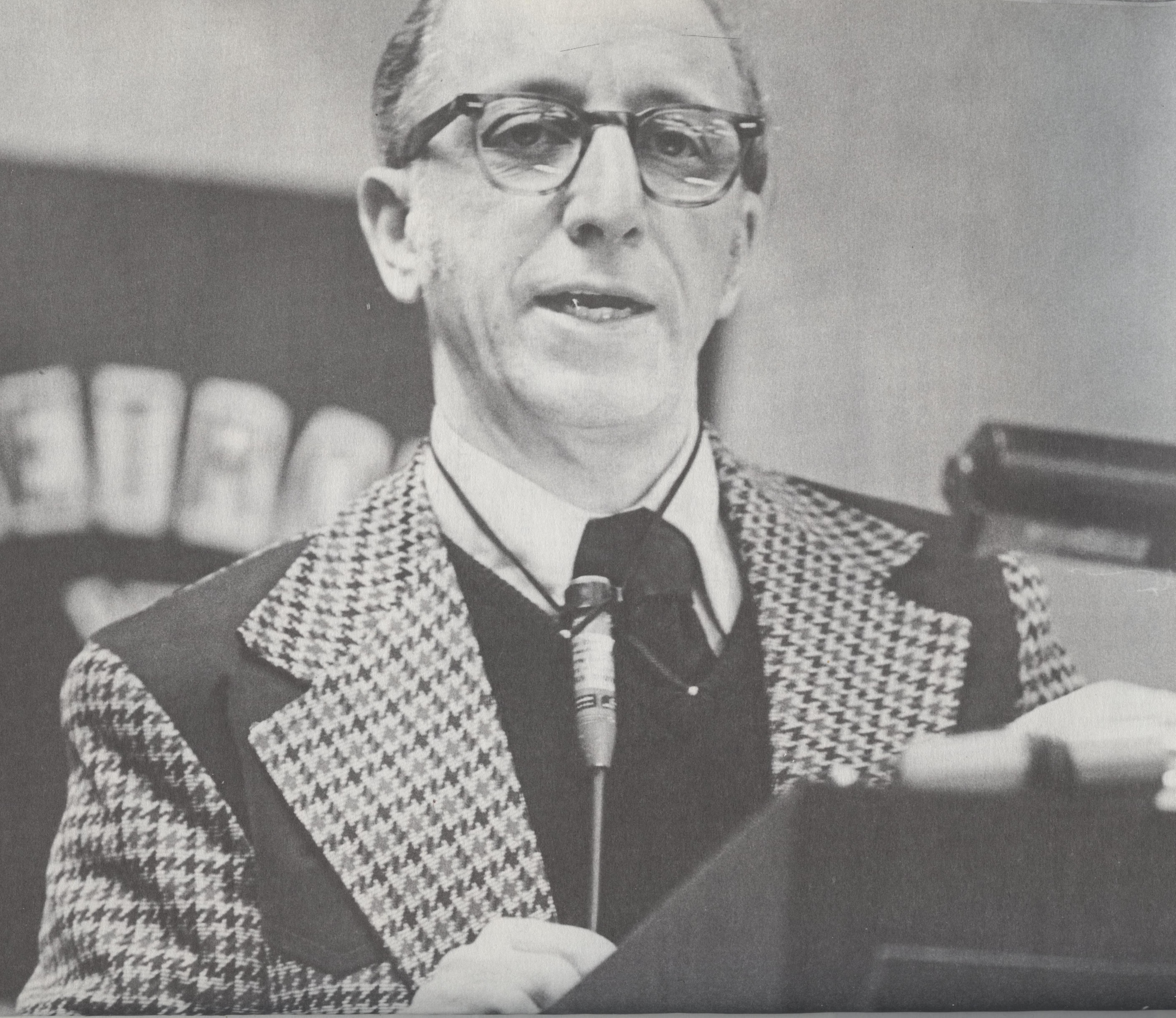
Baer addresses the first annual Gametronics Conference in San Francisco in 1977.

He started his own company before joining defense contractor Sanders Associates in Nashua, New Hampshire (now part of BAE Systems Inc.) in 1956, where he stayed until retiring in 1987. Baer's primary responsibility at Sanders was overseeing about 500 engineers in the development of electronic systems being used for military applications. Out of this work came the concept of a home video game console. He would go on to create the first commercial video game consoles, among several other patented advances in video games and electronic toys. As he approached retirement, Baer partnered with Bob Pelovitz of Acsiom, LLC, and they invented and marketed toy and game ideas from 1983 until Baer's death.

Baer was a Life Senior Member of Institute of Electrical and Electronics Engineers. His son, Mark, helped lead the nomination process to elevate him to become an IEEE Life Fellow, the highest level of membership within the organization.

== Personal life ==
Baer married Dena Whinston in 1952; she died in 2006. They had three children during their marriage, and at the time of Baer's death, he had four grandchildren. Baer died at his home in Manchester, New Hampshire, on December 6, 2014, according to family and friends close to him.

== Inventions ==
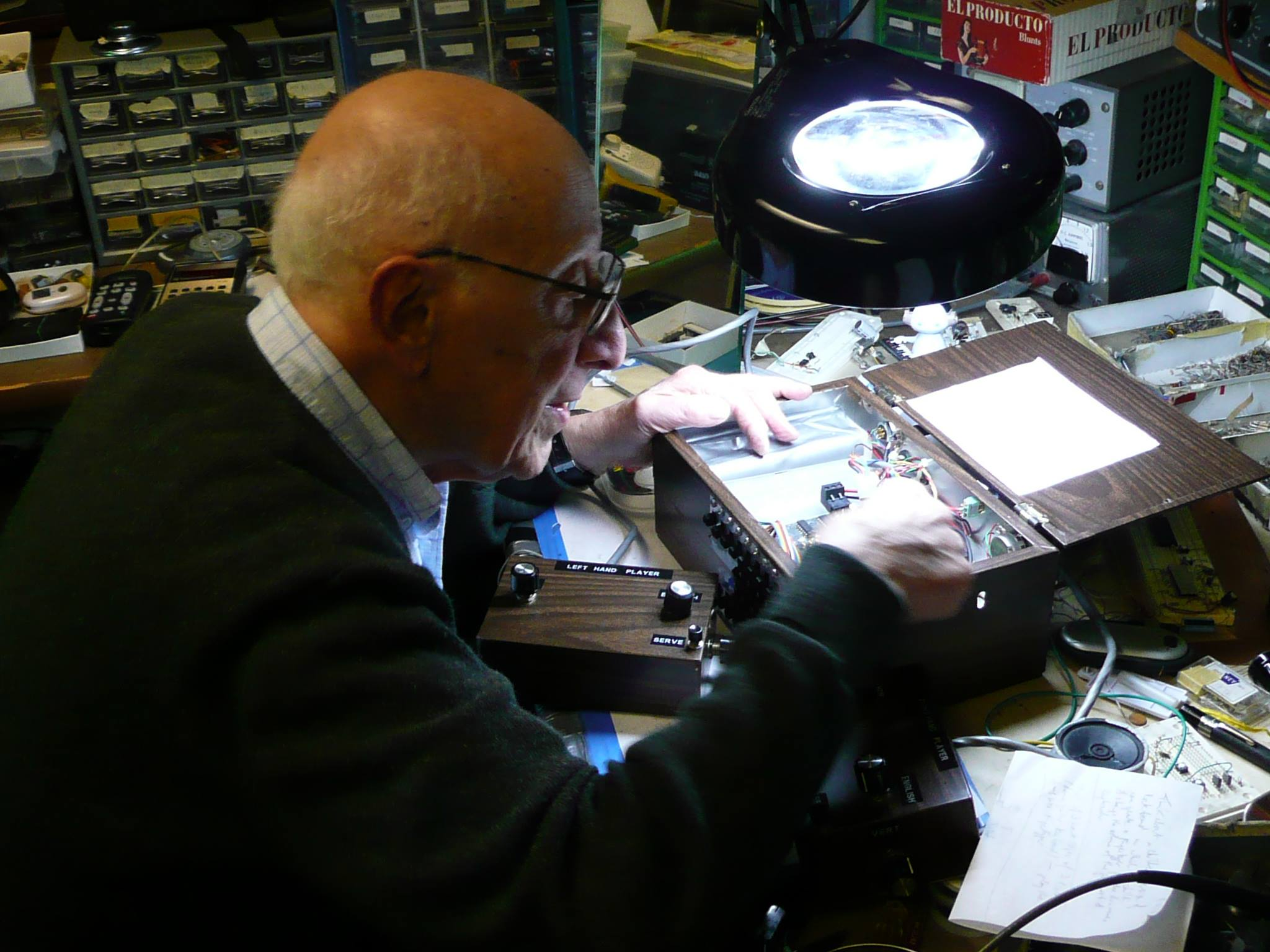
Baer working on a Brown Box reproduction in 2010

In 1966, while an employee at Sanders Associates, Baer started to explore the possibility of playing games on television screens. He first got the idea while working at Loral in 1951, another electronics company, however, they were uninterested in the project at the time. In a 2007 interview, Baer said that he recognized that the price reduction of owning a television set at the time had opened a large potential market for other applications, considering that various military groups had identified ways of using television for their purposes. Upon coming up with the idea of creating a game using the television screen, he wrote a four-page proposal with which he was able to convince one of his supervisors to allow him to proceed. He was given US$2,500 and the time of two other engineers, Bill Harrison and Bill Rusch. They developed the "Brown Box" console video game system, so named because of the brown tape in which they wrapped the units to simulate wood veneer. Baer recounted that in an early meeting with a patent examiner and his attorney to patent one of the prototypes, he had set up the prototype on a television in the examiner's office and "within 15 minutes, every examiner on the floor of that building was in that office wanting to play the game". The Brown Box was ultimately patented on April 17, 1973, given U.S. Patent No. 3728480, and became jointly owned by Ralph Baer and BAE Systems.

Baer began seeking a buyer for the system, turning to various television manufacturers many whom showed little interest in the unit. In 1971, the technology was licensed to Magnavox, which completed the design and released it in September 1972 as the Magnavox Odyssey.

After the release of Pong, which was partially inspired by the table tennis game, on the Odyssey, a lengthy conflict ensued between Baer and Atari co-founder Nolan Bushnell over who was the true "father of video games"; Baer was willing to concede this to Bushnell, though noted that Bushnell "has been telling the same nonsensical stories for 40 years". Ultimately, the industry came to name Baer as the father of the home video game console, while crediting Bushnell with creating the concept of the arcade machine; Upon Baer's death, Bushnell stated that Baer's "contributions to the rise of videogames should not be forgotten".

Baer is also credited with co-developing three popular electronic games. Baer, along with Howard J. Morrison, developed Simon (1978) and its sequel Super Simon (1979) for Milton Bradley, electronic pattern-matching games that were immensely popular through the late 1990s. Simon was assigned Pat No. 4,207,087 in 1980. Baer also developed a similar pattern-matching game "Maniac" for the Ideal Toy Company (1979) on his own, though the game was not as popular as Simon; Baer considered that Maniac was "really hard to play" and thus not as popular as his earlier game.

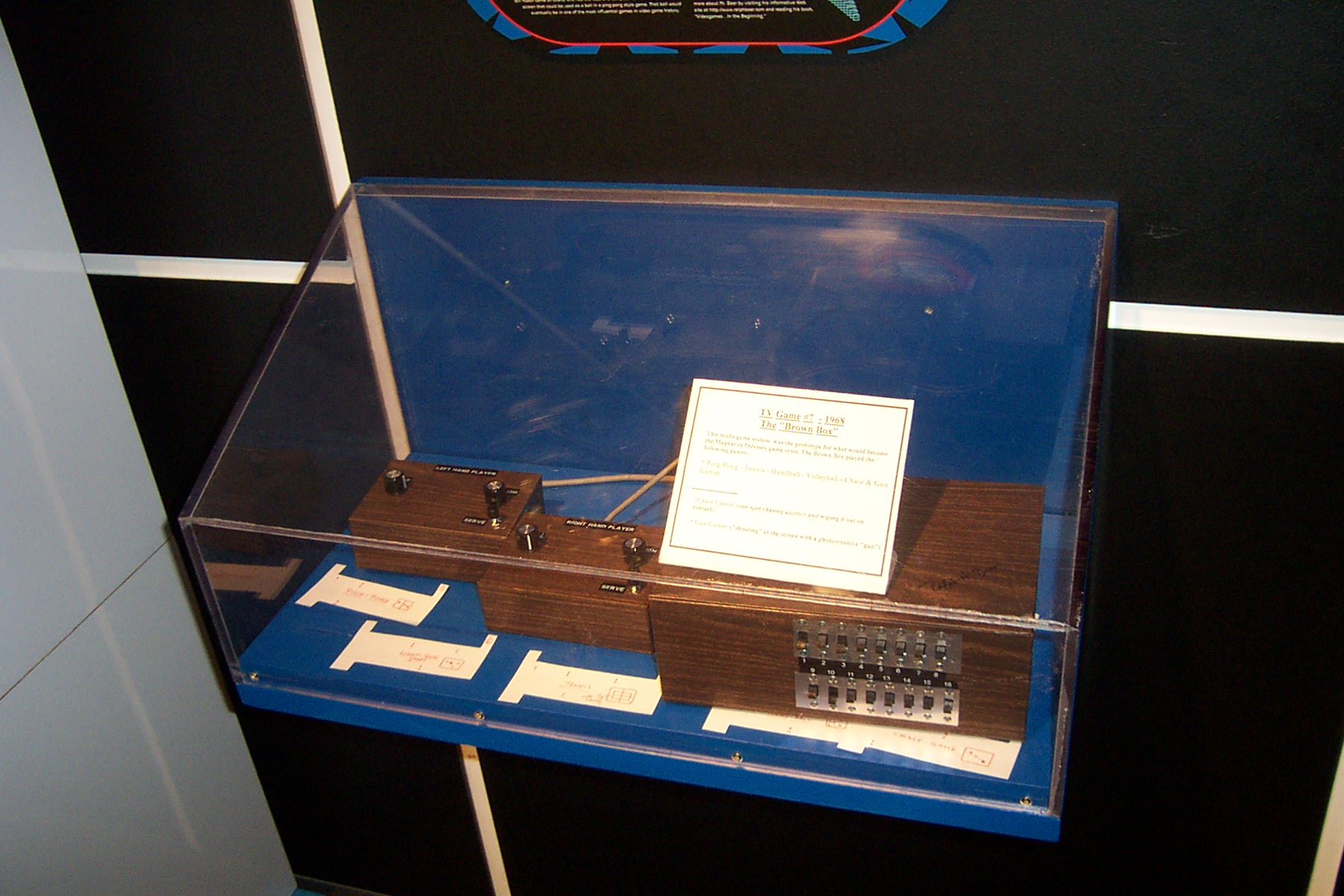
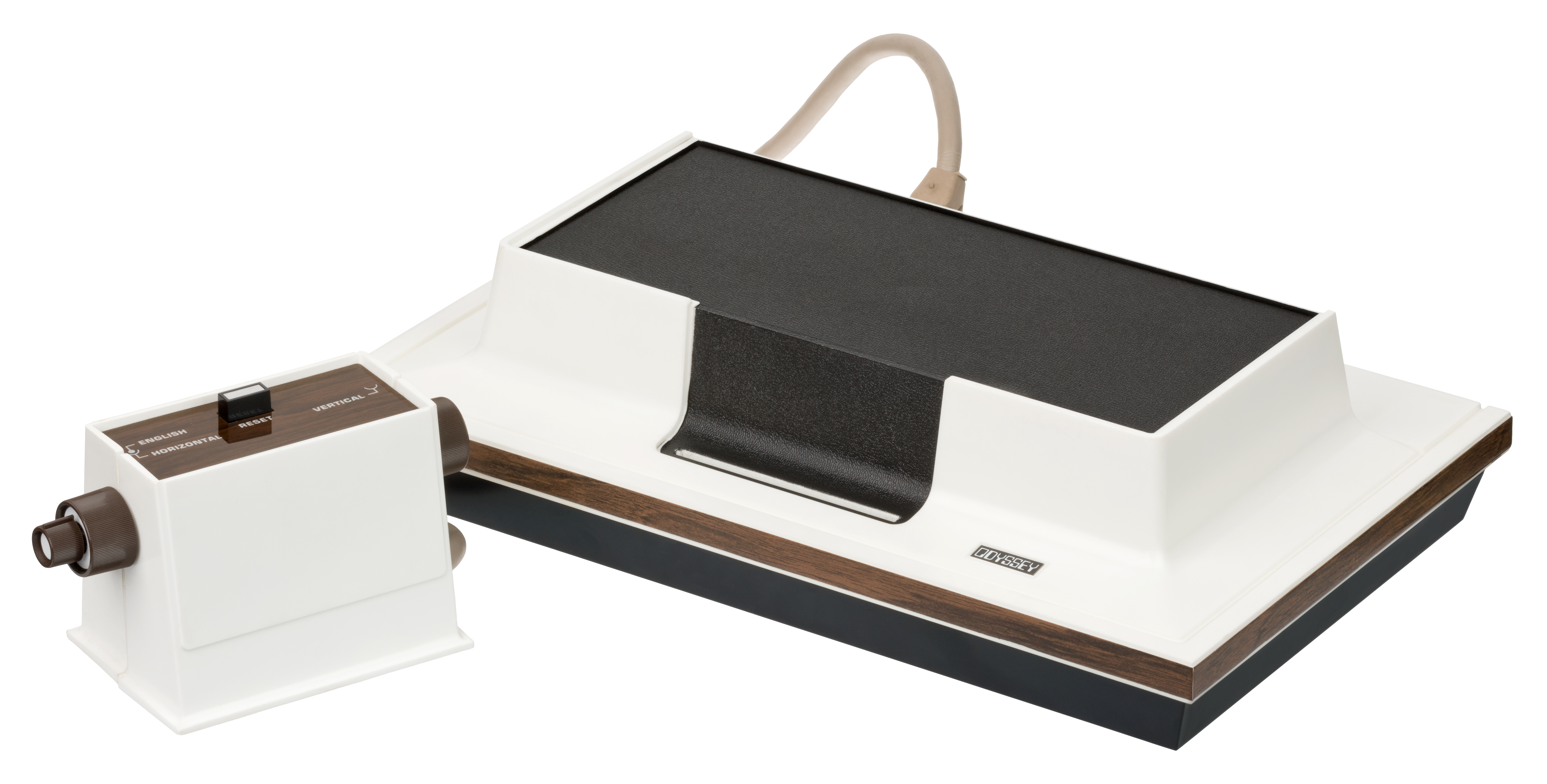
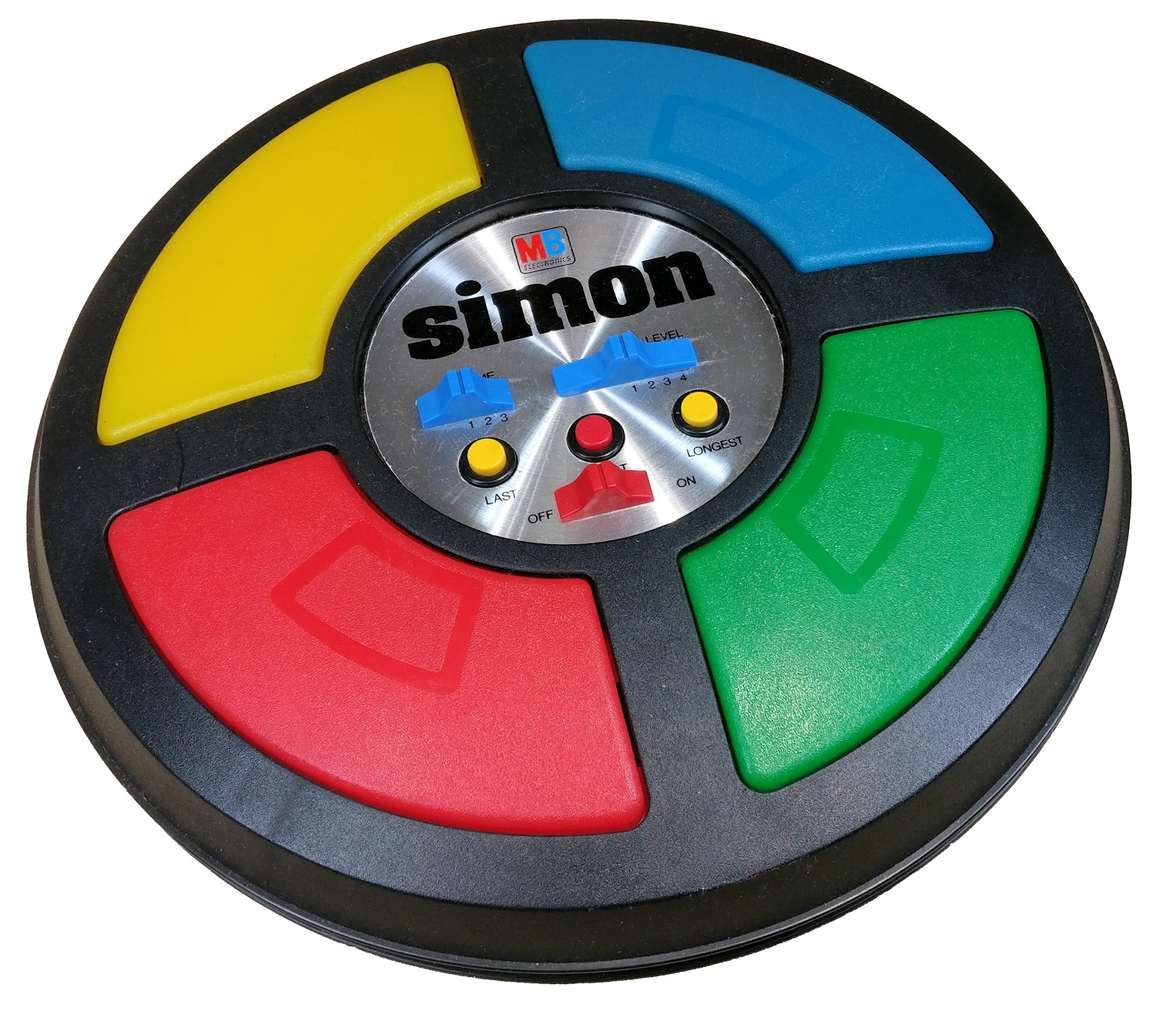
Some of Baer's inventions, from left to right: the "Brown Box" prototype at display at the Smithsonian Institution, the commercially released version of the Magnavox Odyssey, and the electronic pattern-matching game Simon

In 2006, Baer donated hardware prototypes and documents to the Smithsonian Institution. He continued to tinker in until at least 2013. By the time of his death, Baer had over 150 patents in his name. In addition to the patents related to video games, he also held patents for electronic greeting cards and tracking systems for submarines.

== Awards and tributes ==
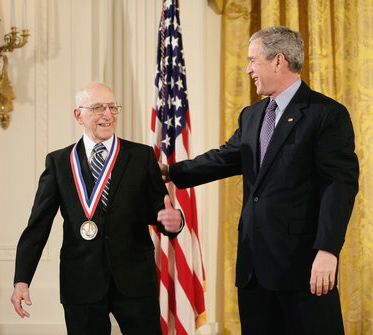
Baer (left) receives the National Medal of Technology from President George W. Bush (right) in 2006.

In addition to being considered "The Father of Video Games", Baer was recognized as a pioneer in the video game field. His accolades include the G-Phoria Legend Award (2005), the IEEE Masaru Ibuka Consumer Electronics Award (2008), the Game Developers Conference Developers Choice "Pioneer" award (2008), and the IEEE Edison Medal (2014). Baer was posthumously given the Pioneer Award by the Academy of Interactive Arts and Sciences at the 2015 Game Developers Conference.

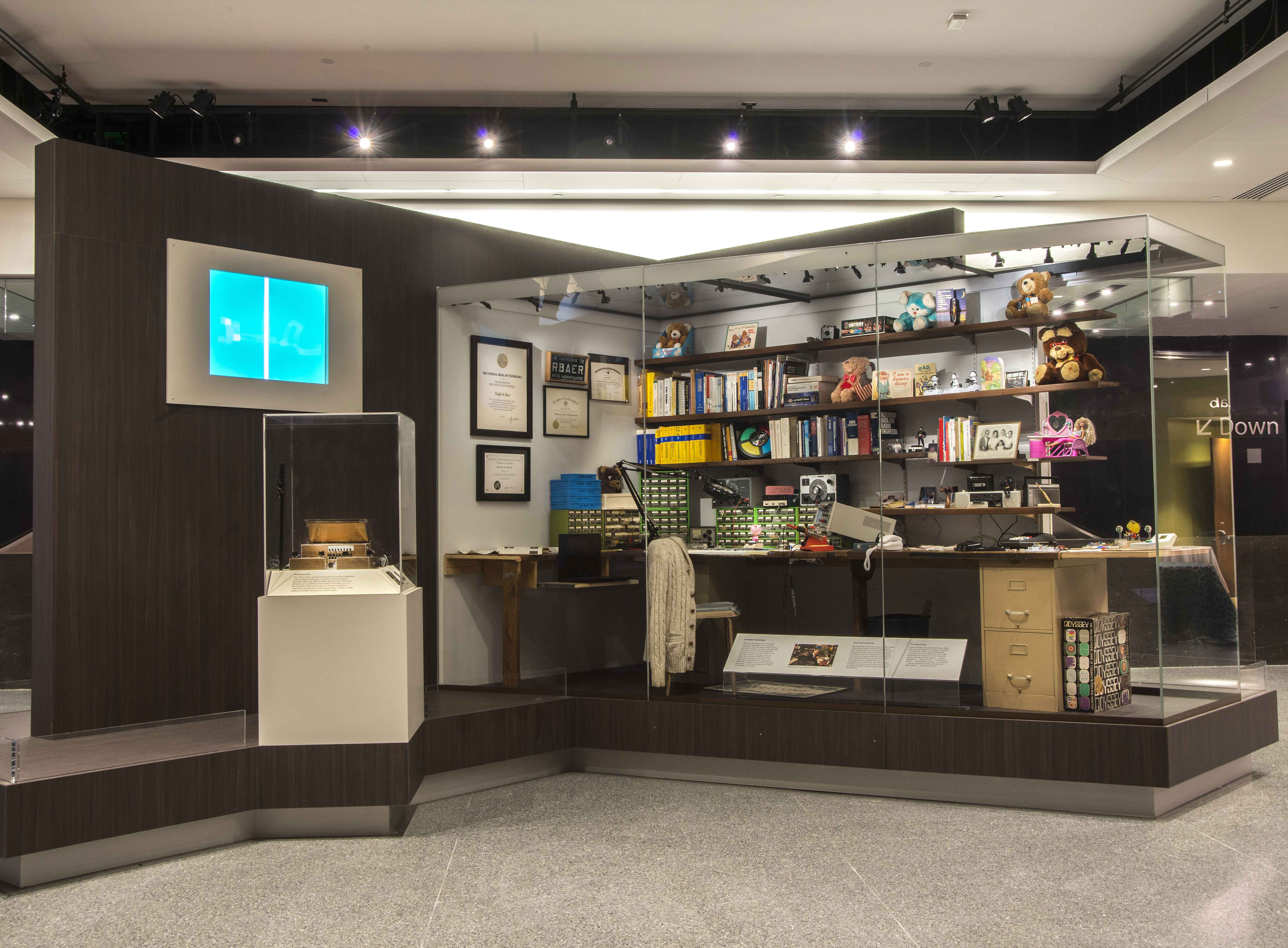
Baer's workshop on display at The Smithsonian National Museum of American History

On February 13, 2006, Baer was awarded the National Medal of Technology by President George W. Bush in honor of his "groundbreaking and pioneering creation, development and commercialization of interactive video games". On April 1, 2010, Baer was inducted into the National Inventors Hall of Fame at a ceremony at the United States Department of Commerce in Washington, D.C. While Baer's contributions had generally been overlooked by more recent advances in video game technology development, Baer had stated "In view of the fact that the President of the United States of America hung the National Medal of Technology around my neck in a White House ceremony in 2006, and in view of my having been inducted into the National Inventors Hall of Fame, I really don't feel neglected."

In 2006, Baer donated many of his inventions to the Smithsonian National Museum of American History. Following his death in 2014, his workshop was removed from the basement of his house on Mayflower Drive in Manchester and to the museum, where it is now on permanent display in the museum’s Innovation Wing.

== Legacy ==
On April 8, 2021, the United States Mint announced that Baer and "Handball" would be honored as part of the American Innovation dollars program.

=== Baer Square ===
On May 10, 2019, a statue was placed in Baer's honor in Arms Park in Manchester, New Hampshire. The area of the park around the memorial was renamed as Baer Square. One of Baer’s sons and several of his grandchildren attended the unveiling. The memorial was funded through a Kickstarter fundraising campaign.
