= Simon (game) =

Electronic game of memory skill

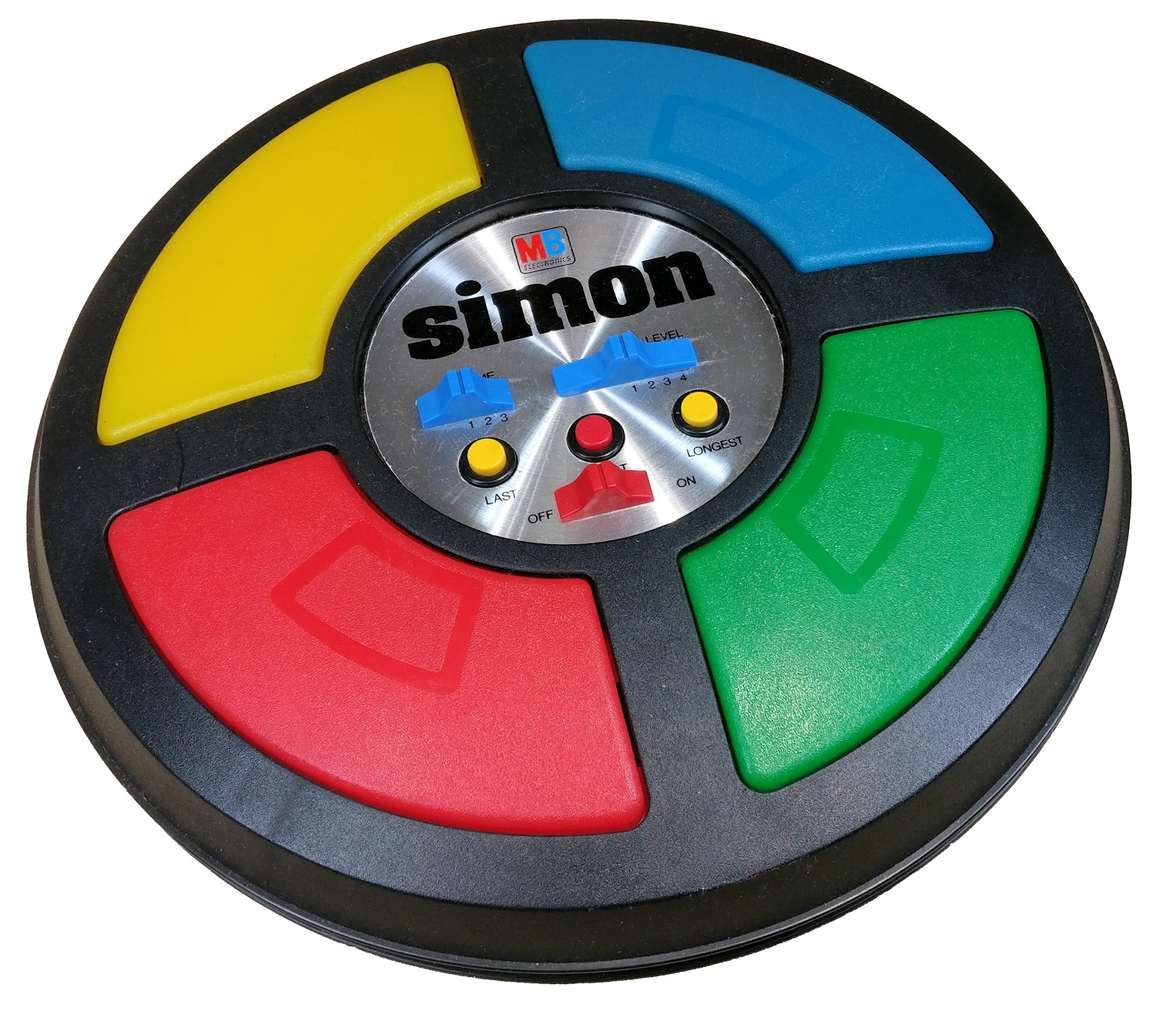
- Type: Electronic game
- Invented by: Ralph H. Baer and Howard J. Morrison
- Company: Milton Bradley (now Hasbro)
- Country: United States
- Availability: 1978–present
- Slogan: My Name Is Simon (1978–present); Think fast! Simon says repeat my flashing LIGHTS and SOUNDS (1978–present); Simon's a computer, Simon has a brain, you either do what Simon says or else go down the drain (1994–1998); The Fun is in the Challenge! (1993); Watch, Remember, Repeat! (2014–present)

Simon is an electronic game of short-term memory skill invented by Ralph H. Baer and Howard J. Morrison, working for toy design firm Marvin Glass and Associates, with software programming by Lenny Cope. The device creates a series of tones and lights and requires a user to repeat the sequence. If the user succeeds, the series becomes progressively longer and more complex. Once the user fails or the time limit runs out, the game is over. The original version was manufactured and distributed by Milton Bradley and later by Hasbro after it took over Milton Bradley. Much of the assembly language code was written by Charles Kapps, who taught computer science at Temple University and also wrote one of the first books on the theory of computer programming. Simon was launched in 1978 at Studio 54 in New York City and was an immediate success, becoming a pop culture symbol of the 1970s and 1980s.

== History ==
Ralph H. Baer and Howard J. Morrison were introduced to Atari's arcade game Touch Me at the Music Operators of America (MOA) trade show in 1976. Baer said of the product, "Nice gameplay. Terrible execution. Visually boring. Miserable, rasping sounds." Baer built the prototype using the low-cost Texas Instruments TMS 1000 microcontroller chip, which was in many games of the 1970s. Lenny Cope, who was one of Ralph H. Baer's partners, programmed the core of the game, titled Follow Me at the time. Baer developed the tones of the game, inspired by the notes of a bugle. When they pitched the demo, an 8-by-8-inch console, to the Milton Bradley Company, the name of the game was changed to Simon. Simon debuted in 1978 at a retail price of $24.95 (equivalent to $123 in 2025). It became one of the top-selling toys that Christmas shopping season. U.S. patent 4,207,087: "Microcomputer controlled game", was granted in 1980. Milton Bradley capitalized on the original with both the expanded, eight-button Super Simon (1979) and the smaller-sized Pocket Simon (1980).

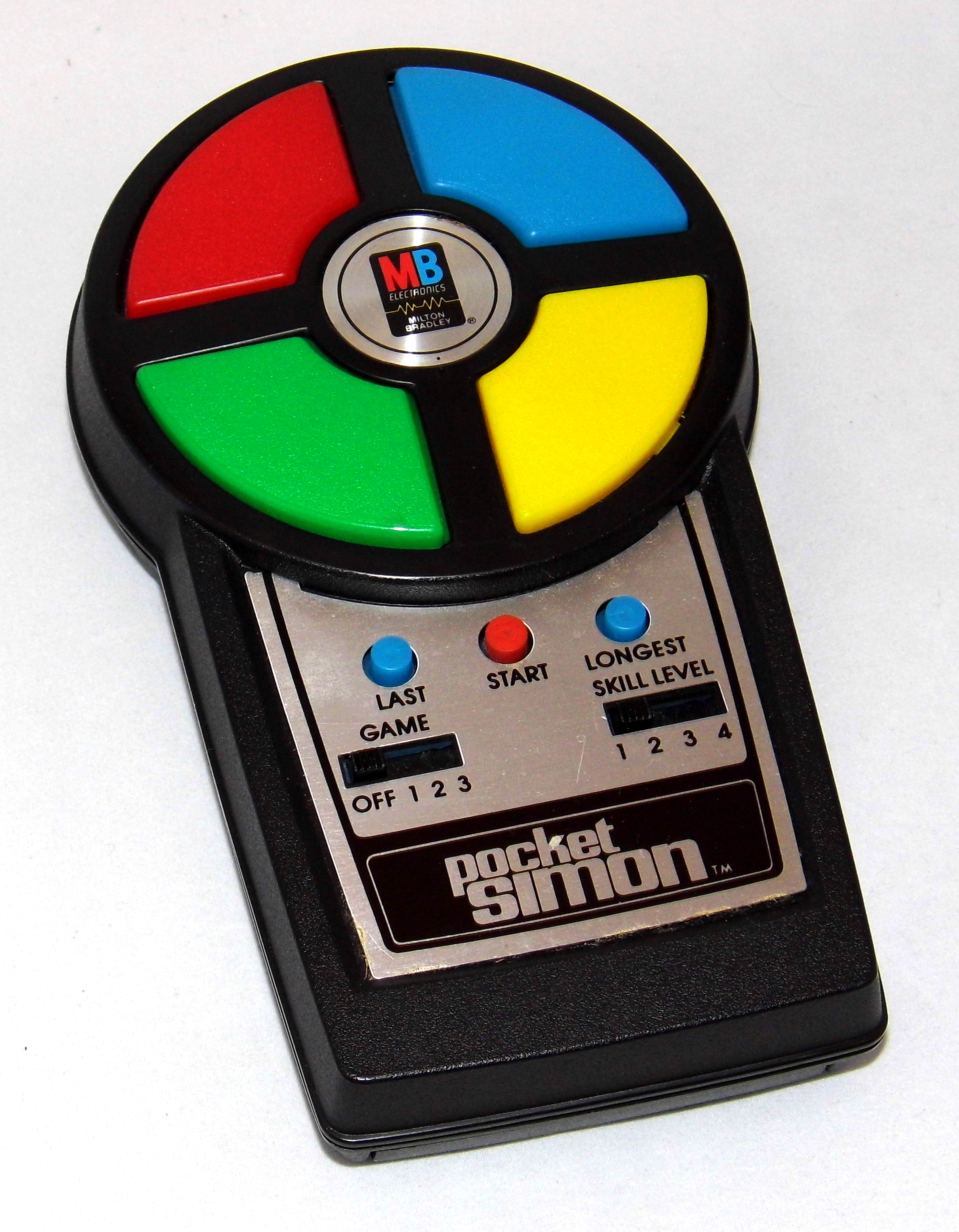
Pocket Simon

Many variants of Simon have been made since Hasbro acquired Milton Bradley in the 1980s, building on the possibilities offered by advances in technology. In 2000, Simon Squared (or Simon^{2}), a unit with the four traditional buttons on one side, and a set of eight smaller buttons on the other, was created. In 2003, the original Super Simon was reinvented as a hexagonal unit with six buttons, which was only released in Europe. In 2004, Hasbro released the Simon . The game featured two electronic sticks (modeled after drumsticks), an emphasis on the musical part of the game, and featured four levels of play.

In 2005, Hasbro released Simon Tricks (also known as Simon Trickster in US and as Simon Genius in Brazil), which featured four game modes, in a similar fashion to another Hasbro game, Bop It, and colored lenses instead of buttons. "Simon Classic" mode played up to 35 tones (notes). "Simon Bounce" was similar to "Simon Classic", but the colors of the lenses changed. In "Simon Surprise," every lens became the same color and the player had to memorize the location. "Simon Rewind" required the player to memorize the sequence backwards. During each game, the player was paid a compliment after completing a certain number of tones. On reaching five and eleven tones, the computer would randomly choose "Awesome!", "Nice!", "Sweet!", or "Respect!". On reaching 18 tones, the game would play a victory melody three times. On reaching the ultimate 35 tones, the game would play the victory melody again and say "Respect!". If the player failed to memorize the pattern or failed to press the right color within the time limit, the game would play a crashing sound and say "Later!".

In 2011, Hasbro introduced Simon Flash. In this version, the game was played with four cube-shaped electronic modules that the player must move around depending on the game mode.

In 2013, Hasbro introduced Simon Swipe. The game was demonstrated at the New York Toy Fair 2014 and released that summer. The game was a circular unit that looked like a steering wheel. It had eight touchscreen buttons, which were flattened out on the unit. The game featured four game modes, called "Levels" (the main game), "Classic", "Party" and "Extreme". The player had to go through all sixteen levels to beat the game. "Classic", "Party", and "Extreme" levels focused on one pattern getting longer and longer until the player is out.

In 2014, a smaller version of the game, called Simon Micro Series, was introduced. This version had only two game modes called "Solo" and "Pass It", and featured 14 levels and four buttons. There was also a version of Simon, created by Basic Fun, known as the Touch Simon. This version had an LCD screen and played melodies at specific parts of the game.

In 2016, Hasbro launched the follow-up to Simon Swipe with Simon Air. The game was announced at a Hasbro press conference before the 2016 New York Toy Fair. This version of Simon used motion sensors, similar to those in Mattel's Loopz line of games. The game had three game modes: "Solo", "Classic", and "Multiplayer". A button-pressing version of Simon was released in the US, with an aesthetic recalling that of the 1970s and 1980s models.

In 2017, Hasbro released Simon Optix, a headset game with motion sensor technology similar to Simon Air. Multiple Optix units could wirelessly interconnect for multiplayer gameplay; the first Simon game to do so.

== Gameplay ==
The original, or "Classic", version has four colored buttons, each producing a particular tone when it is pressed or activated by the device. A round in the game consists of the device lighting up one or more buttons in a random order, after which the player must reproduce that order by pressing the buttons. As the game progresses, the number of buttons to be pressed increases. (This is only one of the games on the device; there are actually other games on the original.)

Simon is named after the simple children's game of Simon Says, but the gameplay is based on Atari's unpopular Touch Me arcade game from 1974. Simon differs from Touch Me in that the Touch Me buttons were all the same color (black) and the sounds it produced were harsh and grating.

Simon's tones, on the other hand, were designed to always be harmonic, no matter the sequence, and consisted of an A major triad in second inversion, resembling a trumpet fanfare:

- E (blue, lower right);
- C♯ (yellow, lower left);
- A (red, upper right).
- E (green, upper left, an octave lower than blue);

Some of the original 1978 models used an alternative set of tones, forming the B♭ minor triad:

- B♭ (blue, lower right);
- D♭ (yellow, lower left);
- F (red, upper right).
- B♭ (green, upper left, an octave higher than blue);

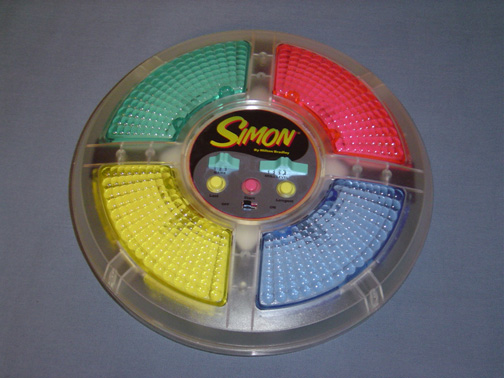
The 1997 rerelease of Simon with a new, clear design

Simon was later re-released by Milton Bradley – now owned by Hasbro – in its original circular form, though with a translucent case rather than plain black. It was also sold as a two-sided Simon Squared version, with the reverse side having eight buttons for head-to-head play, and as a keychain (officially licensed by Fun4All) with simplified gameplay (only having Game 1, Difficulty 4, available). Other variations of the original game, no longer produced, include Pocket Simon and the eight-button Super Simon. Nelsonic released an official wristwatch version of Simon.

Later versions of the game included a pocket version of the original game in a smaller, yellow, oval-shaped case. Another iteration, Simon Trickster, plays the original game as well as variations in which the colors shift around from button to button (Simon Bounce), the buttons have no colors at all (Simon Surprise) and the player must repeat the sequence backwards (Simon Rewind). A pocket version of Simon Trickster was also produced.

In the 2014 version of Simon called Simon Swipe, the notes are as follows:

- G (blue, lower right);
- C (yellow, lower left);
- E (red, upper right).
- G (green, upper left, an octave higher than blue)

The swiping sounds are presented with sliding between notes. The bigger the slide, the bigger the swipe will be. The exact notes and sound effects were also used for a smaller version, called Simon Micro Series. The sounds were then recreated for Simon Air and Simon Optix.

== Clones ==
As a popular game, Simon inspired many imitators. Atari released a handheld version of Touch Me in 1978, with multicolored buttons and pleasant musical tones. Though named for the older arcade game, the handheld Touch Me contained Simon's three game variations and four difficulty levels, but with limits of 8, 16, 32 and 99 instead of 8, 14, 20 and 31. Even its button layout mirrored that of Simon (though upside-down), with blue in the upper left, yellow in the upper right, red in the lower left, and green in the lower right. Its only unique features were an LED score display, similar to that of its arcade counterpart, and its small size, similar to that of a pocket calculator.

Other clones include:

- Nintendo's Flagman, part of the Game & Watch series
- Monkey See, Monkey Do, which featured a similar casing as that of Simon, except that the buttons were oval-shaped.
- Tiger Electronics' Copy Cat in 1979, re-released with a transparent case in 1988 and using buzzers.
  - Repackaged and released by Sears as Follow Me.
  - Released as Copy Cat Jr. in 1981, and as Pocket Repeat by Tandy and Radio Shack.
- Castle Toy's Einstein in 1979.
- Genius, launched in the 1980s in Brazil, by Brinquedos Estrela.
- Space Echo by an unknown company.
- Makezine has a DIY version that requires soldering.
- Another DIY version called Electronic Memory Game based on ARM Cortex microcontrollers
- The "Game A" mode of the second game in the Game & Watch handheld series Flagman (Silver, 5th Jun 1980). "Game B" is the same, but does not play in a sequence, while the player has a limited time to press the corresponding number lit up.
- R2-D2 Ditto Droid, a Star Wars version featuring R2-D2 sounds and Star Wars-themed graphics by Tiger Electronics, 1997.
- VTech's Wizard.
- A sidequest in both the SNES and Game Boy Advance versions of Donkey Kong Country 3: Dixie Kong's Double Trouble! that involves freeing creatures called "Banana Birds" using buttons on each system's controller.
- Soviet Elektronika IE-01 Ivolga, nearly an exact visual replica of Simon.
- Oddworld games, in which the playable character must progress by completing certain puzzles with a sequence of sounds.

The same gameplay also appears on multi-game handhelds such as:

- Tiger Electronics' Brain Warp and Brain Shift games: instead of tones, the game unit issues a recorded voice that calls out colors and numbers in Game 4 - Memory Match. Brain Shift has two memory games, Game 2 (Memory Shift) and Game 3 (Who Shift's It?), that call out colors.
- Mego Corporation's Fabulous Fred (Game 3, The Memory Game).
- Parker Brothers' Merlin (Game 3, Echo).
- Atari also included a nine-button version of Touch Me as game variations 1-4 (out of 19) on the 1978 Brain Games cartridge for the Atari 2600.
- A fan-made version of Simon was unofficially made available for modded Wiis in 2008.
- A Harry Potter wand released in 2001, called Harry Potter Magic Spell Challenge, had Simon gameplay and voice commands: "Wingardium" (to tilt the wand down) and "Leviosa" (to tilt the wand up.).
- Toytronic's GOTCHA!, a similar handheld with 8 buttons instead of 4, produced in a rounded "big" version and a smaller, "pocket" one.

== Audio ==
Some versions of the game have tones that play as long as the button is depressed, but others have a constant sound duration. Some versions feature audio themes, such as animals (cat/dog/pig/cow), xylophone, football, and space sounds. Some versions have a sound on/off setting, which can make the game harder with only visual cues.

== Reception ==
Games magazine included Simon in their "Top 100 Games of 1980", praising it as "the original electronic 'follow the leader' game" with Simon as "a cheerful fellow" who "talks to you in sequences of musical tones and lights". By 1979, sales of Simon reached 1.5 million.

== Reviews ==
- Games #8

== Bibliography ==
- Edwards, Owen (September 1, 2006). "Simonized: In 1978 a new electronic toy ushered in the era of computer games". Smithsonian Magazine. Archived from the original on November 11, 2006.
- "Simon: 'The Electronic Game that Started it All' Turns 25" (Press release). Hasbro. February 10, 2003. Archived from the original on May 27, 2006.
- US patent for the game's Electronic game housing
