= Simon Says =

Children's game

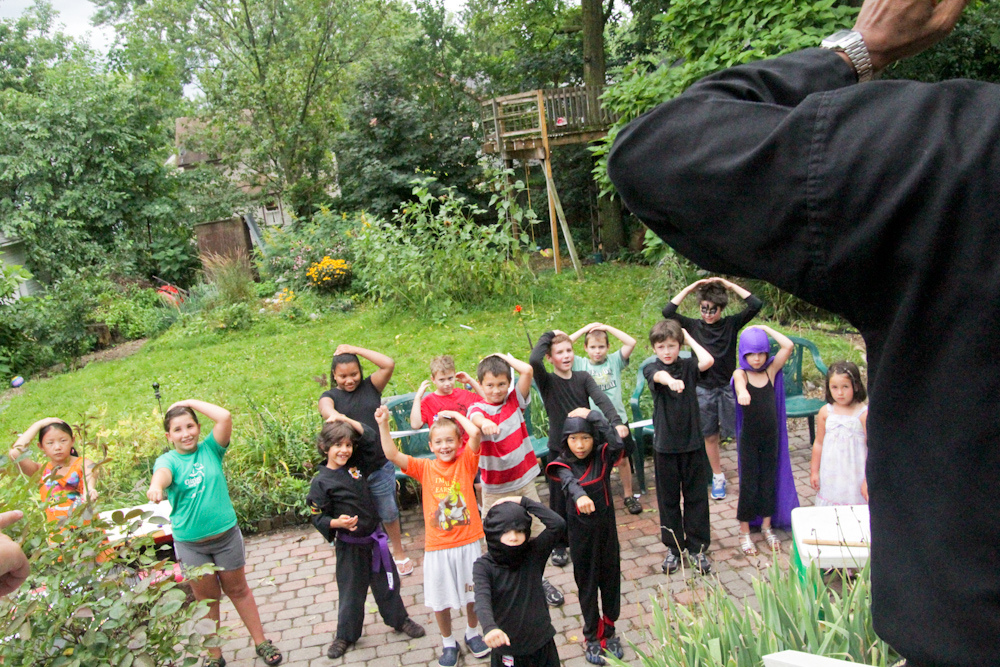
Children playing Simon Says with "Simon" (the controller) in the foreground

Simon Says is a children's game for three or more players. One player takes the role of "Simon" and issues instructions (usually physical actions such as "jump in the air" or "stick out your tongue") to the other players, which should be followed only when succeeding the phrase "Simon says". Players are eliminated from the game by either following instructions that are not immediately preceded by the phrase, or by failing to follow an instruction which does include the phrase "Simon says". It is the ability to distinguish between genuine and fake commands, rather than physical ability, that usually matters in the game; in most cases, the action just needs to be attempted.

The object for the player acting as Simon is to get all the other players out as quickly as possible; the winner of the game is usually the last player who has successfully followed all of the given commands. Occasionally, however, two or more of the last players may all be eliminated at the same time, thus resulting in Simon winning the game.

The game is embedded in popular culture, with numerous references in films, music, and literature.

In Ireland, and some parts of the United Kingdom, the game is also known as "O'Grady says".

== Other languages ==
This game has translated across multiple cultures, many of them retaining the name Simon. Others substitute another name ("Yakup der ki" / "Jacob says" in Turkish, "Jacques a dit" / "Jack said" in French), refer to some authority figure as with قال المعلّم / "The teacher says" in Lebanon, or use the verb alone as with Mando / "I say" in Spanish.

== Game play and variants ==
A command starting with "Simon says" means that the players must obey that command. A command without the beginning "Simon says" means do not do this action. Anyone who breaks one of these two rules is eliminated from the remainder of the game. Often, anyone who speaks is also eliminated.

=== Simon says (electronic version) ===
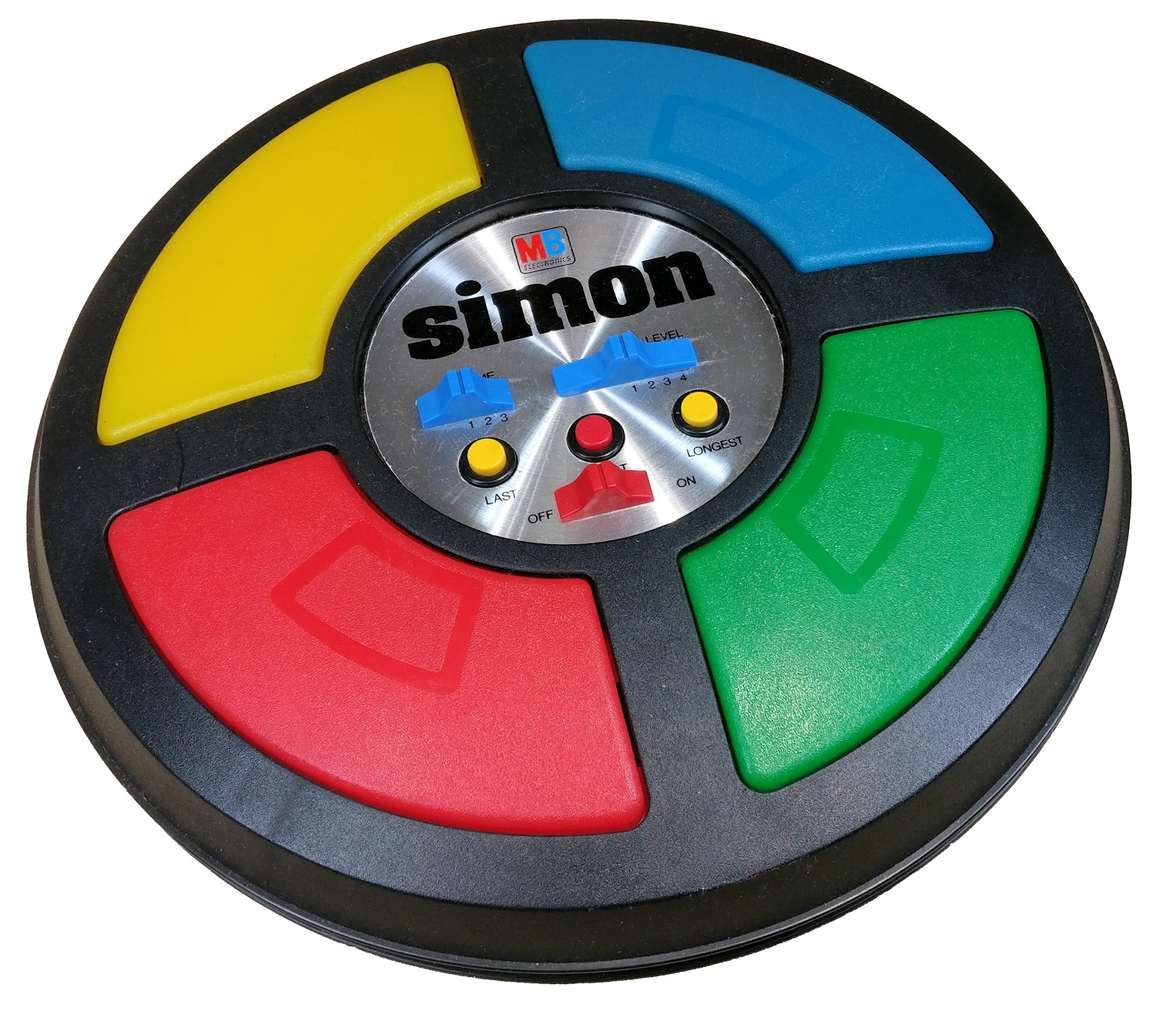
The electronic game Simon

The electronic game Simon is named for Simon Says. Instead of having to listen to the presence of the instruction phrase, the player has to repeat a short sequence of button presses after demonstration by the device. This game play has been repeated as mini-game in many subsequent video games and is often referred to as "Simon Says" as well, despite the differences from the playground game.

=== Do this do that ===
A variation on the instruction phrases is used in this variant. Instead of only actions beginning with "Simon says" having to be obeyed, an action along with the phrase "do this" must be obeyed while an action with the phrase "do that" must not be obeyed. Obeying a "do that" command or not obeying a "do this" command will eliminate a player. In Swedish, this variant is known as Gör si, gör så.

=== Following John ===
A similar Swedish child's game is "Följa John" meaning "following John", where physical actions are conducted by "John" (usually involving movement in a line), and where remaining participants are replicating the activities shown by John. However, the commands are silent, and based on the remaining participants observation of John's actions. Especially when performed in a line, this can become a physical action equivalent of the game Telephone.

== Other references ==
- Arnold, Arnold, The World Book of Children's Games, World Publishing Co., 1972, ISBN 0-529-00778-9.
- Bancroft, Jessie H., Games for the Playground, Home, School and Gymnasium, The Macmillan Co., 1914.
- Forster, Sally, Simon Says... Let's Play, Dutton Children's Books, 1990, ISBN 0-525-65019-9.
- Grunfeld, Frederic V., Games of the World: How to Make Them, How to Play Them, How They Came to Be, Holt, Rinehart and Winston, 1975, ISBN 0-03-015261-5.
