= Merlin (console) =

Early handheld electronic video game

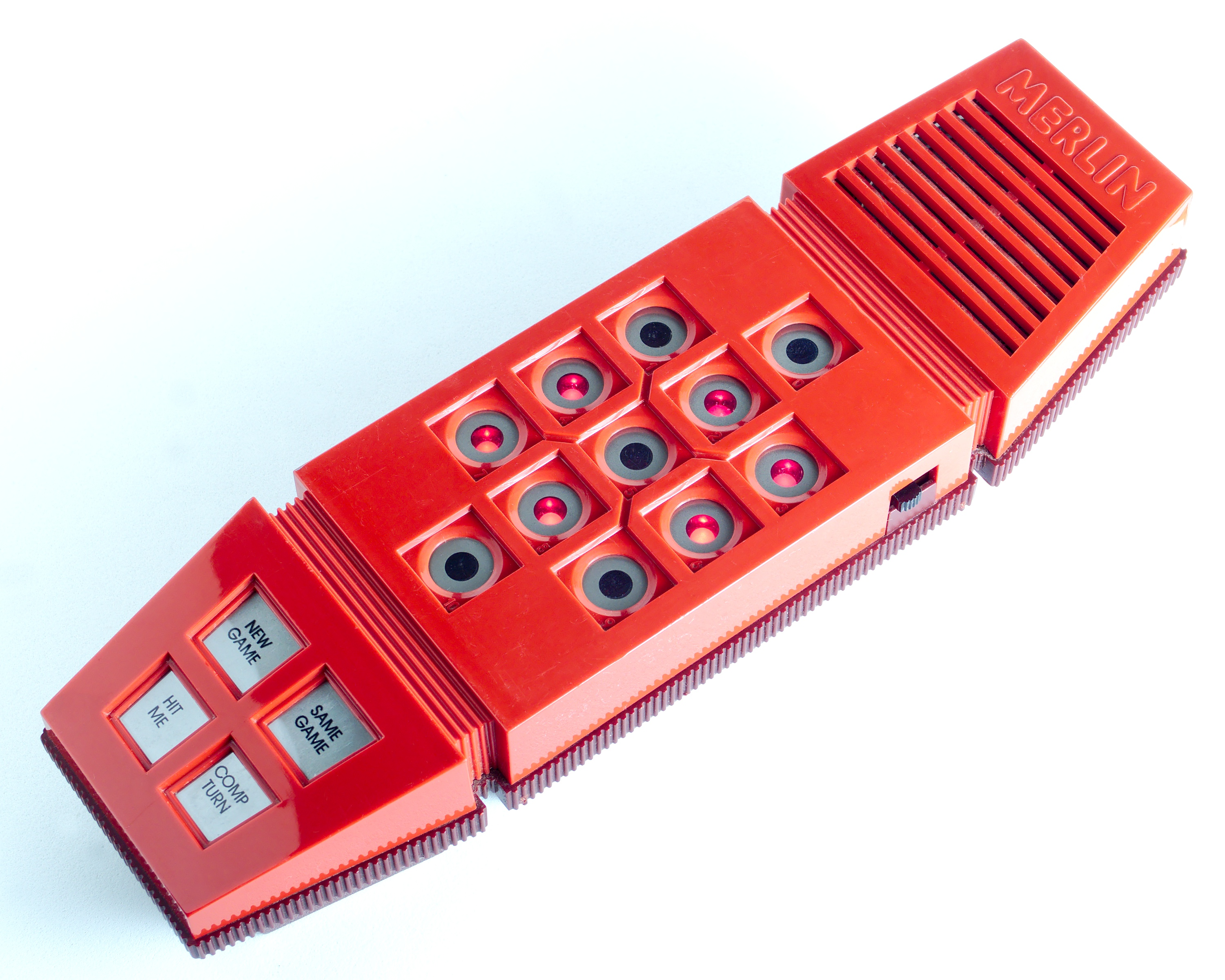
- Merlin playing Magic Square
- Also known as: Merlin The Electronic Wizard
- Developer: Parker Brothers (formerly); Hasbro (currently)
- Manufacturer: Parker Brothers
- Type: Handheld electronic game
- Generation: First generation
- Released: 1978
- Units sold: >5 million
- CPU: Texas Instruments TMS1000
- Memory: 48 bytes of RAM
- Display: Matrix with 11 LED buttons
- Sound: Played through internal speaker
- Input: 11 LED buttons + 4 buttons + on/off switch
- Power: Batteries: 6 AA batteries Power supply: AC adaptor (nominal: 9 Volt DC at 75 milliamps / maximum: 10.5 Volt DC at 5 milliamps / minimum: 7.5 Volt DC at 150 milliamps)
- Weight: 250 gram (no batteries)/391 gram (with batteries)
- Website: theelectronicwizard.com

Merlin (also known as Merlin The Electronic Wizard, stylized as MERLIN) is a handheld electronic game first made by Parker Brothers in 1978.

The game was invented by former NASA employee Bob Doyle, his wife Holly, and brother-in-law Wendl Thomis. Merlin is notable as one of the earliest and most popular handheld games, selling over 5 million units during its initial run, as well as one of the most long-lived, remaining popular throughout the 1980s. A version of the game was re-released in 2004 by the Milton Bradley Company.

== Overview ==
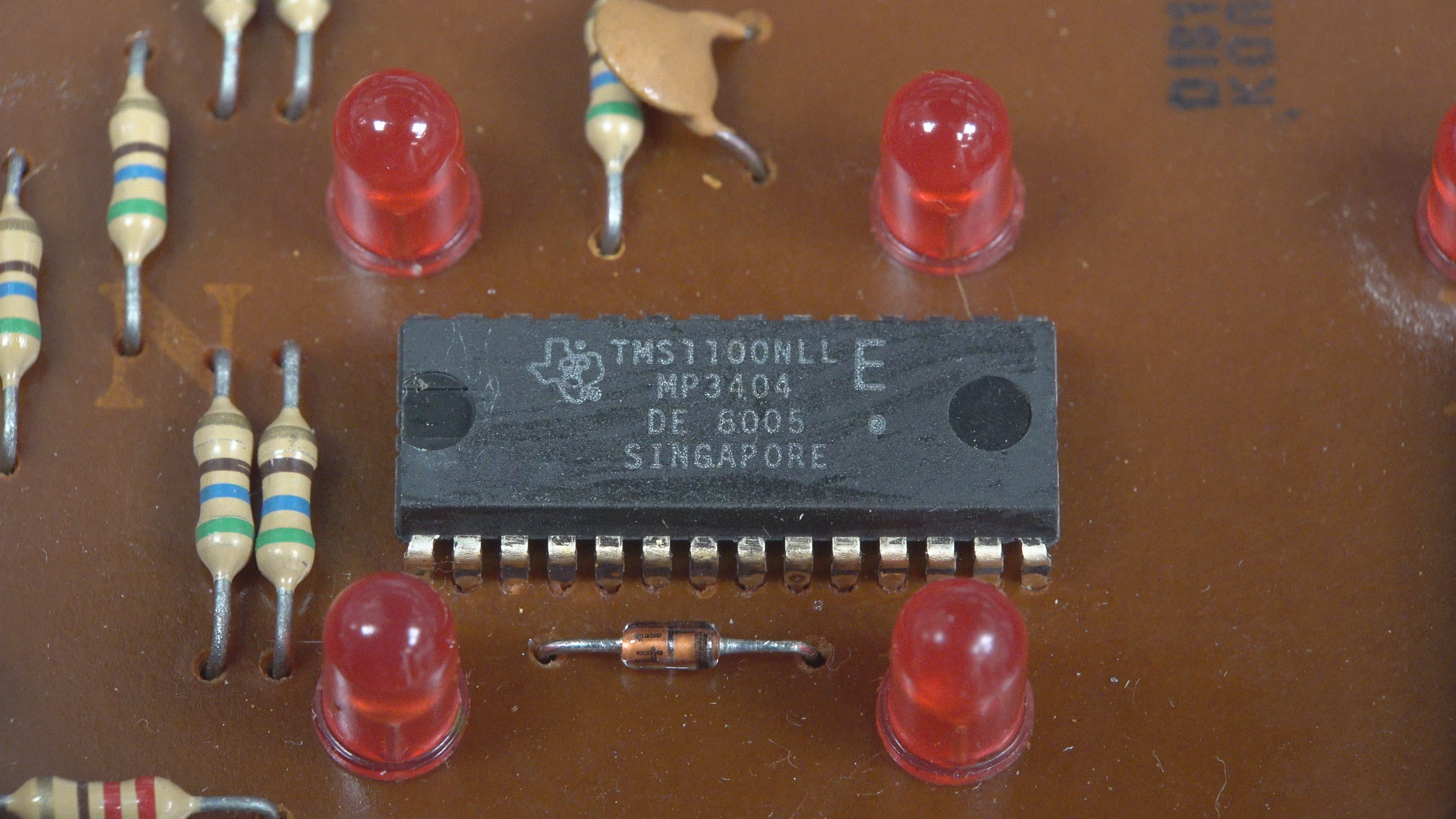
The TMS1100 inside a Merlin

Merlin has the form of an octagonal device about nine and a half inches long and three inches wide. The play area of the game consists of a matrix of 11 buttons; each button contains a red LED. These buttons can either light up or flash. The array is encased in a red plastic housing, bearing a slight resemblance to an overgrown touch-tone telephone. Four game-selection and control buttons are also placed at the bottom of the unit; a speaker takes up the top section. Supporting electronics (including a simple microcontroller) are contained within the shell of the game. Parker Brothers later released "Master Merlin" with more games, and the rarer "Split Second", where all games involve time with a more advanced display, having line segments around the dots. Both of these shared the same general case shape and came out a few years after Merlin.

Merlin's simple array of buttons and lights supported play of six different games, some of which could be played against the computer or against another person. The games that can be selected are:

- Tic tac toe
- Music machine
- Echo, a game similar to Simon
- Blackjack 13
- Magic square, a pattern game similar to Lights Out
- Mindbender, a game similar to Mastermind

The music machine game functions as a musical instrument; in this mode, each key is assigned a musical note, and sequences of notes can be recorded and played back. This makes Merlin one of the earliest digital sequencers as well as an early consumer-level electronic synthesizer.

In 1978, Merlin appeared with Milton Bradley's Simon on the cover of the Christmas issue of Newsweek and the October issue of Boston.

Merlin was Parker Brothers's most successful product in terms of units and revenue until Frogger in 1982. The Toy Manufacturers of America named Merlin the best selling toy and game item (SKU) in America in 1980 with 2.2 million sold.

In its lifetime, it sold more than 5 million units.

== Merlin: The 10th Quest ==
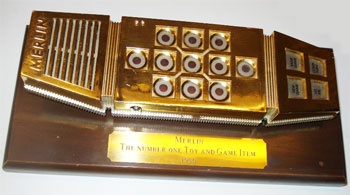
Gold Merlin

In 1995, Parker Brothers redesigned Merlin, including making it a one-player game with more challenges called Merlin: the 10th Quest. The premise of Merlin was still the same, but for each game completed, an icon was displayed on the screen showing proof of victory. Instead of the six games from the original, there were nine games:

- Swords & Shields, a game like tic-tac-toe
- Seek the Grail, a game like the shell game
- Castle Keep, a game of guessing a number between 0 and 99
- Spell Bender, a memory-like game
- Mindcaster, played like Mastermind
- Magic Square, played like Lights Out
- Singing Sword
- Ghost Walk
- Dragon Dance

In singing sword, the object is to push the right buttons to make the swords on the screen disappear. Pushing the wrong button will make a sword appear. In ghost walk, directional pads move the ghost towards the center of the screen and destroy it, but the ghost can resist. Dragon dance involves being surrounded in all directions by dragons. If a dragon appears, it is killed by pressing the directional pad where that dragon is. Each of the three last games keep time.

After defeating all nine games, Merlin announces "Brave knight, the challenge awaits" and the 10th quest begins. This involves running through a dungeon maze to escape through the exit. The first round of the dungeon is simple, but the second round shows the walls temporarily before vanishing while the third round has invisible walls.

If the maze is solved in record time, Merlin would say "Congratulations, you are a master" and display the time in the dungeon maze.
