= List of dedicated video game consoles =

This is an incomplete list of dedicated video game consoles in chronological order. Only officially licensed dedicated consoles are listed in the retro style sections.

Dedicated consoles are video game consoles that have a single game or a limited list of games built into the console itself, and are not equipped for additional games that are distributed via ROM cartridges, discs, downloads, or other media. All first-generation video game consoles are dedicated consoles. Starting in the 2000s, there has been a new wave of dedicated consoles focused primarily on retrogaming.

== Early dedicated home consoles (1972–1984) ==
There are 997 home video game consoles known to have been released in the first generation of video game consoles. They can be found in the List of first generation home video game consoles.

== Early handheld electronic games (1976–present) ==
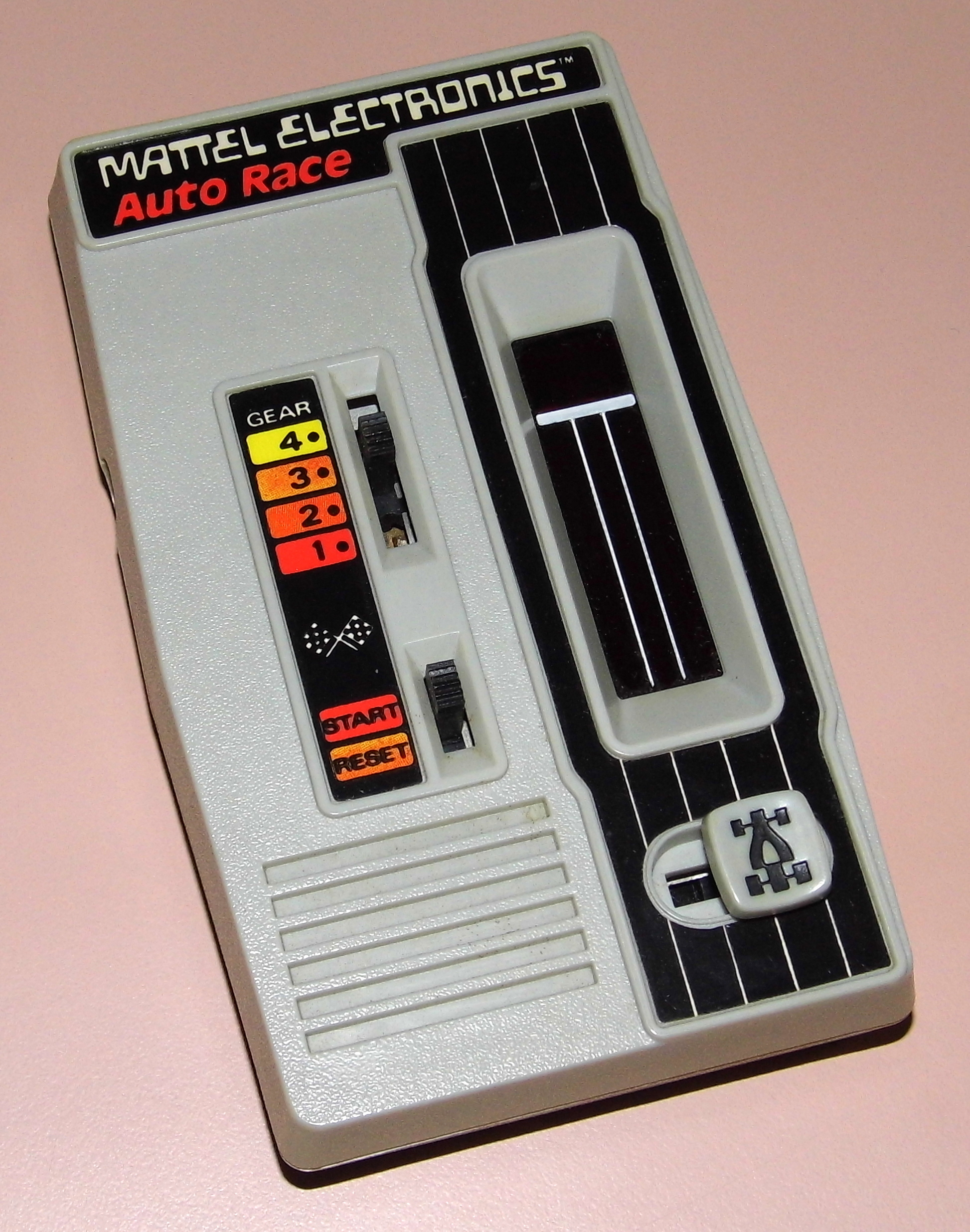
Mattel Auto Race (1976)

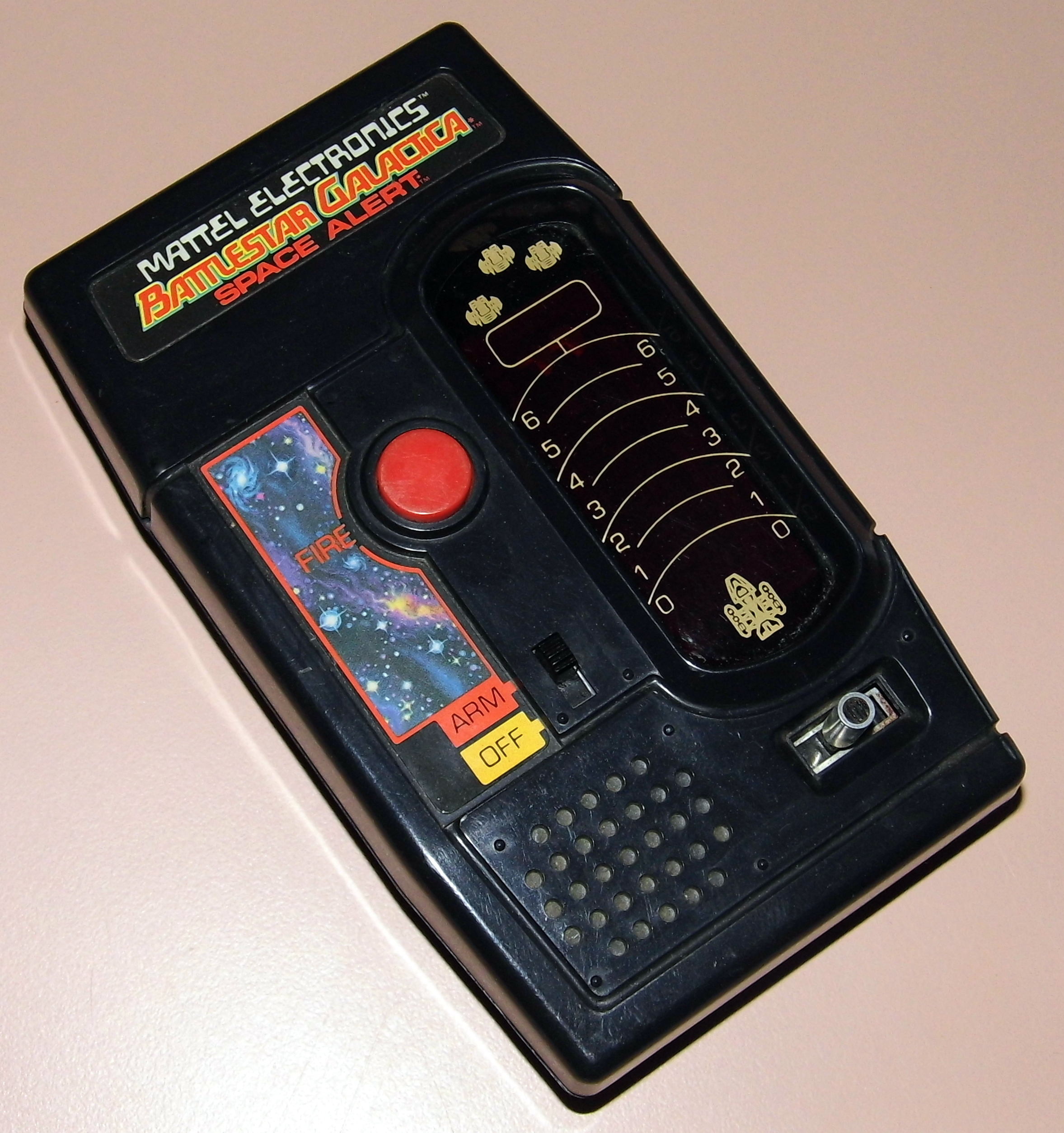
Mattel Electronics Battlestar Galactica Space Alert (1976)

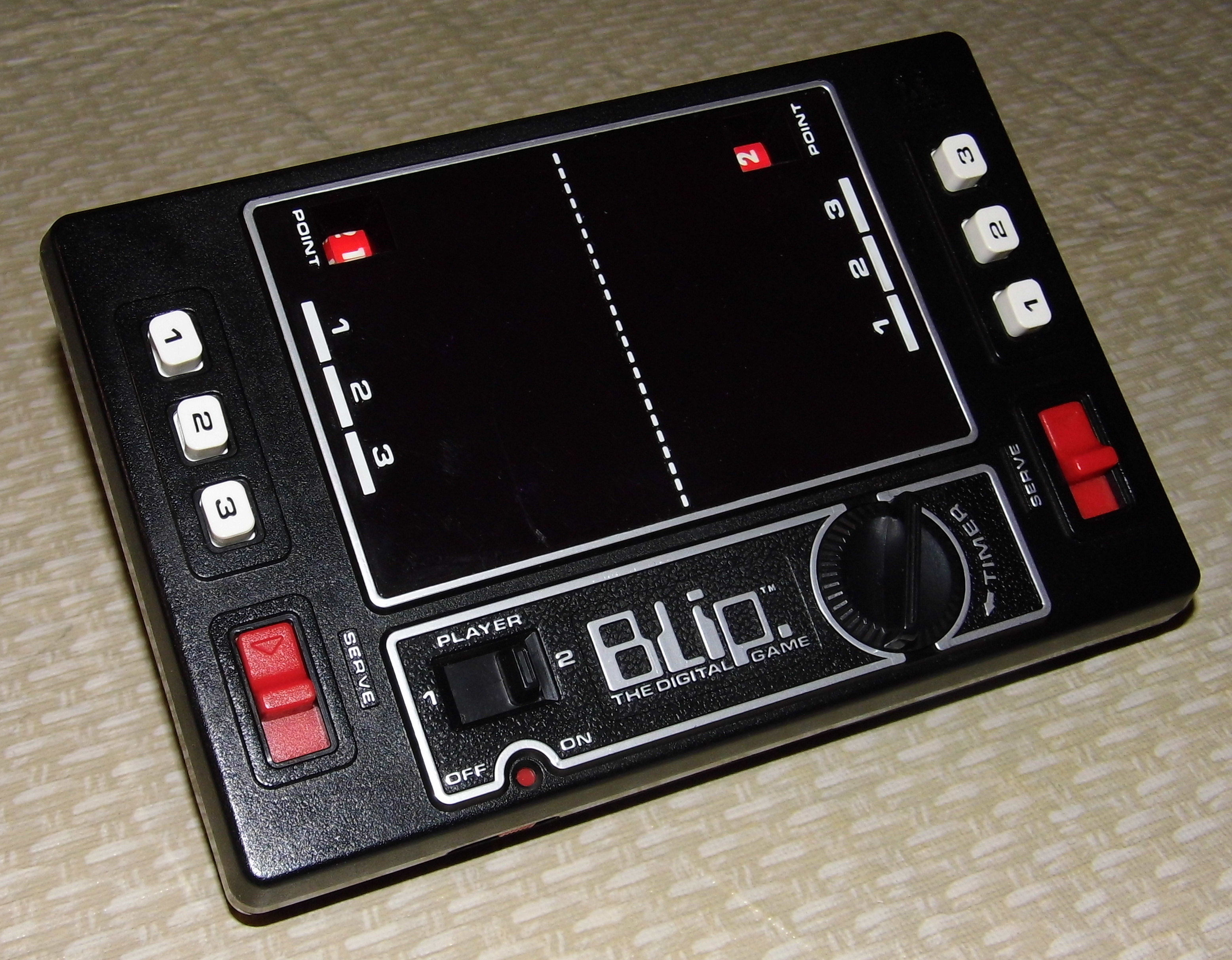
Blip (1977)

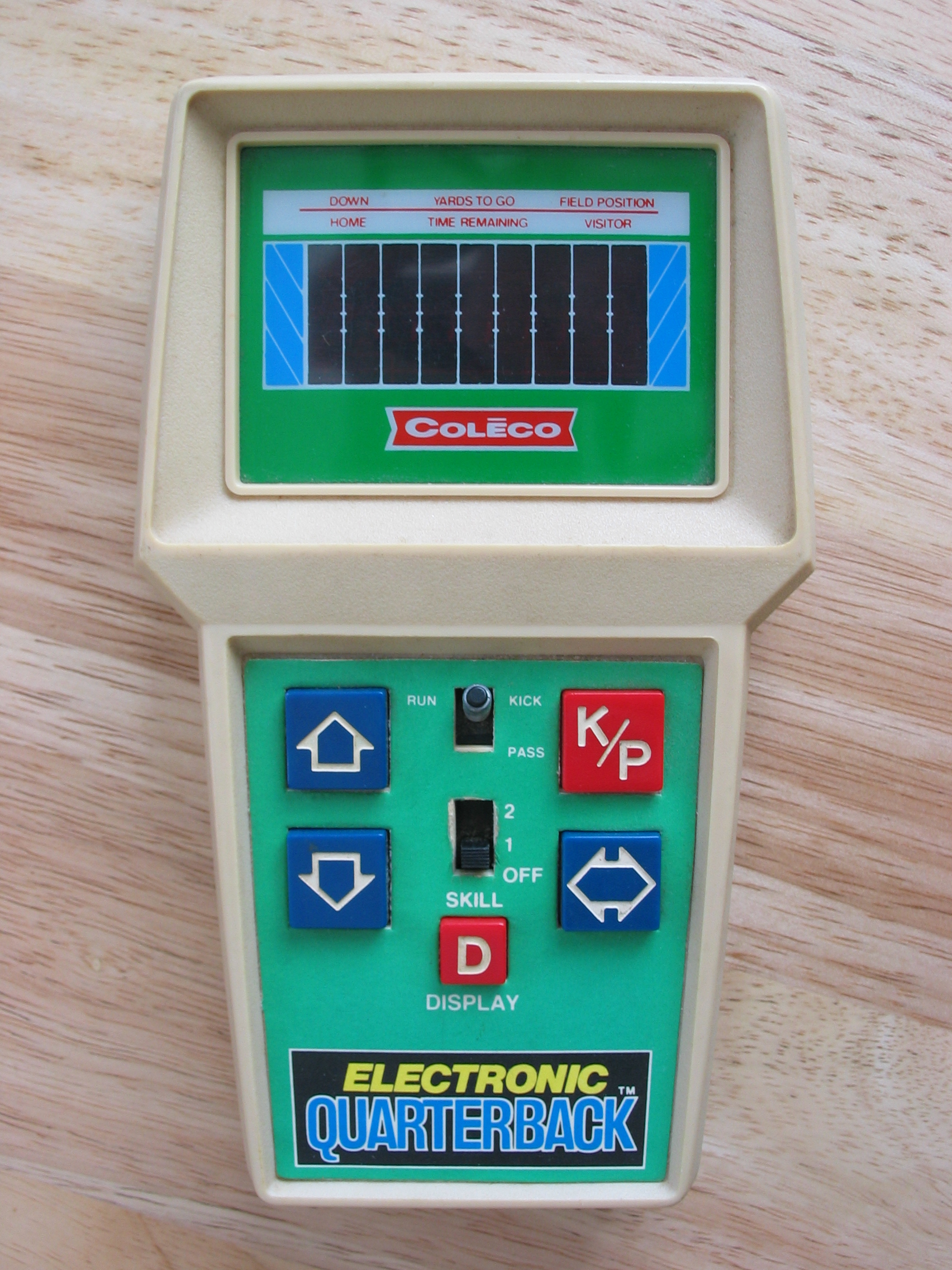
Coleco Electronic Quarterback (1978)

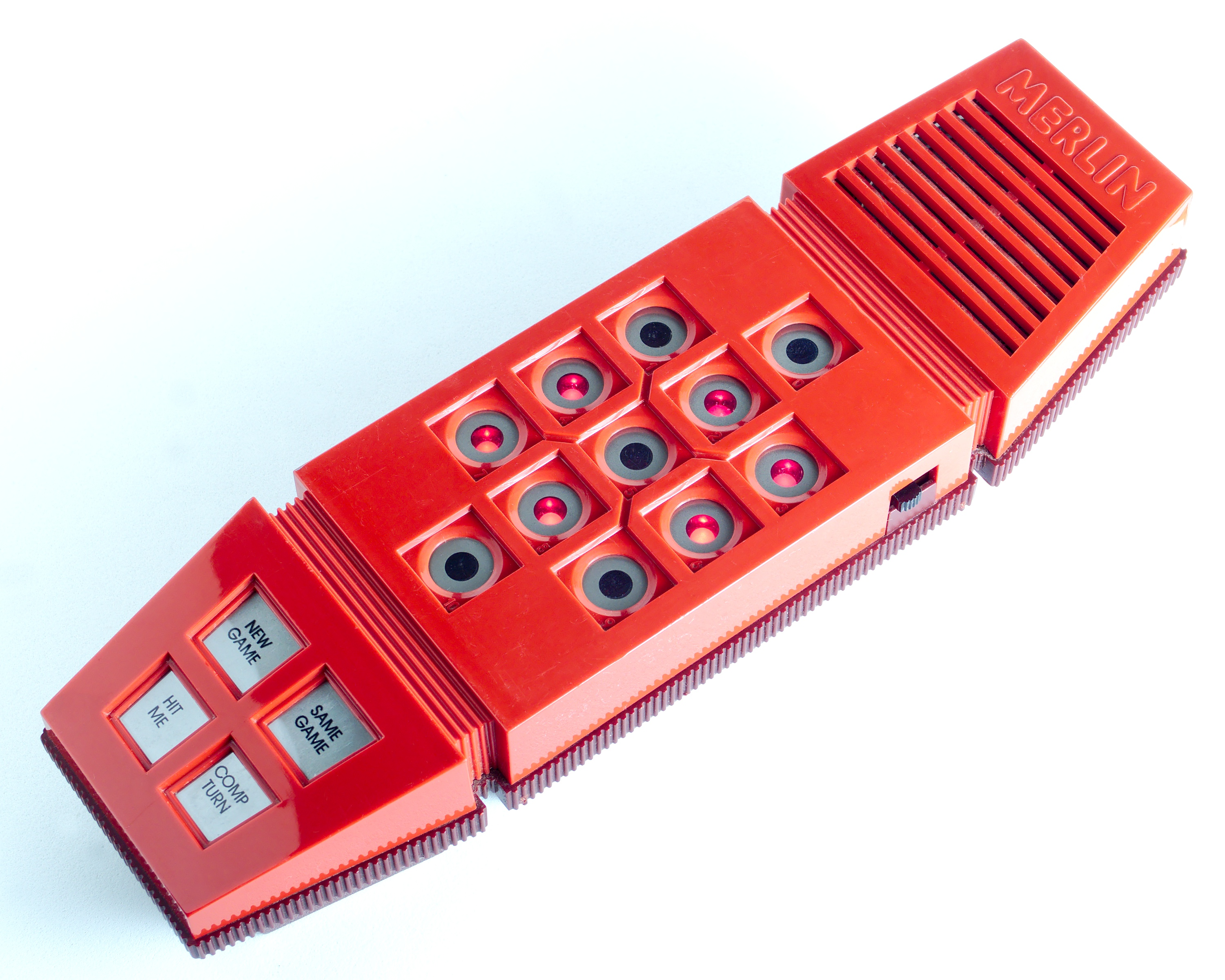
Merlin (1978)

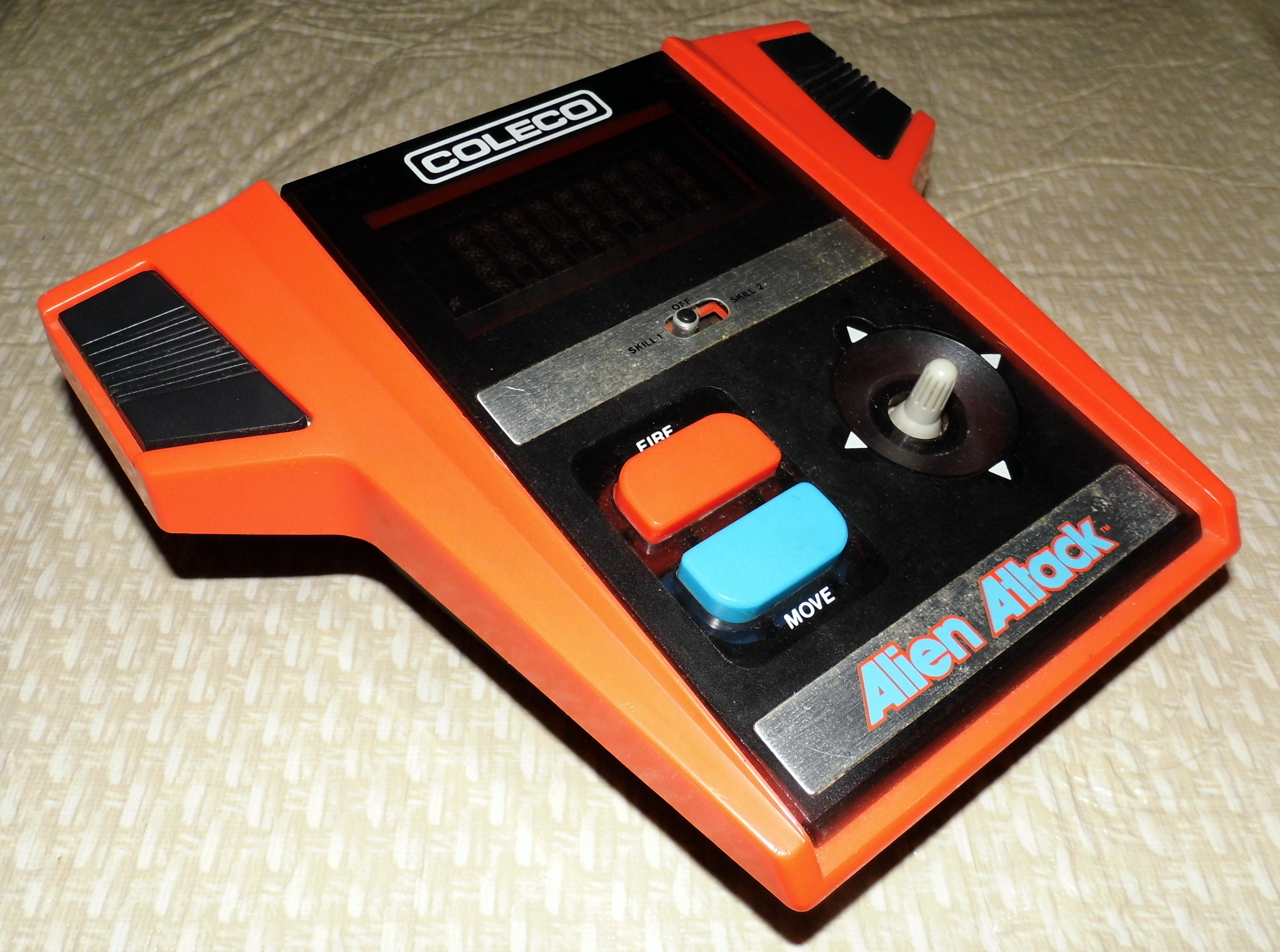
Alien Attack (1979)

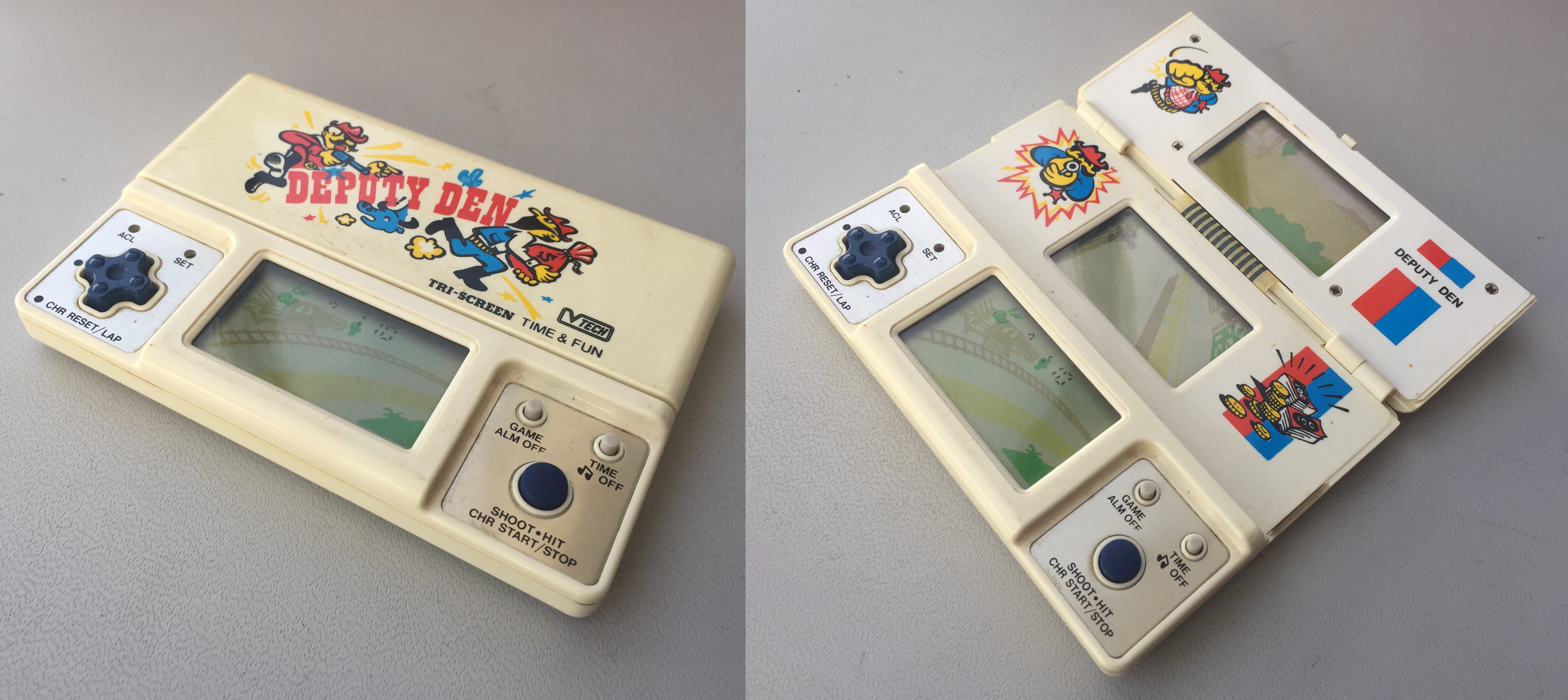
VTech electronic series (1979-1991)

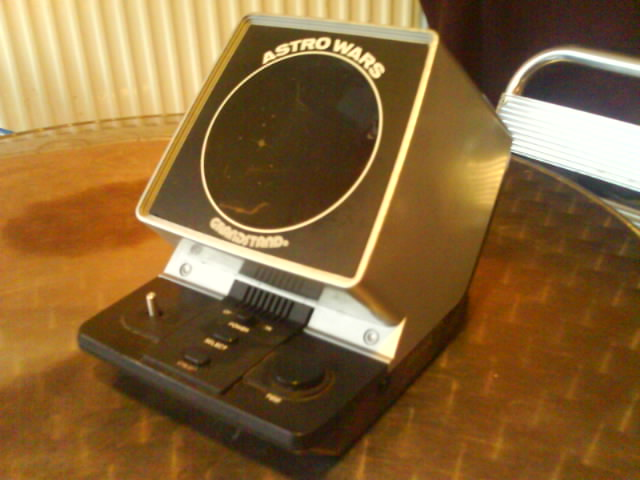
Astro Wars (1981)

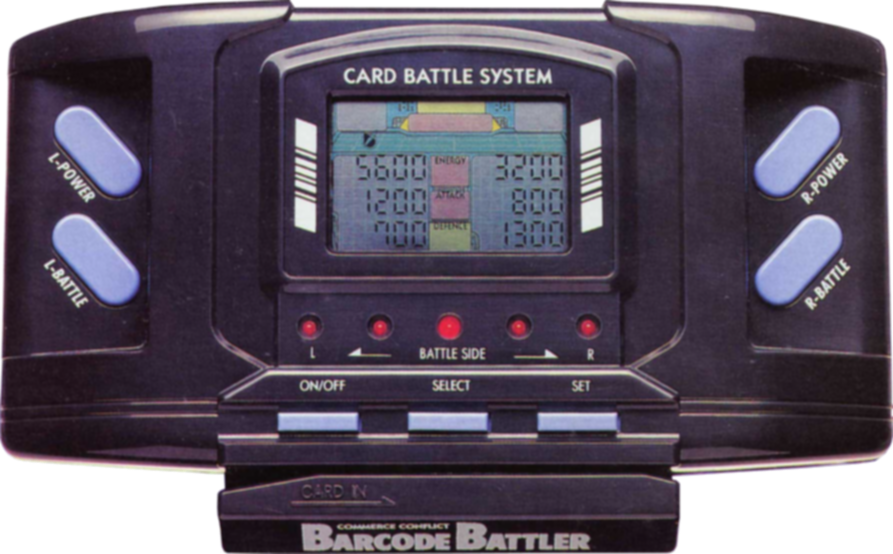
Barcode Battler (1991)

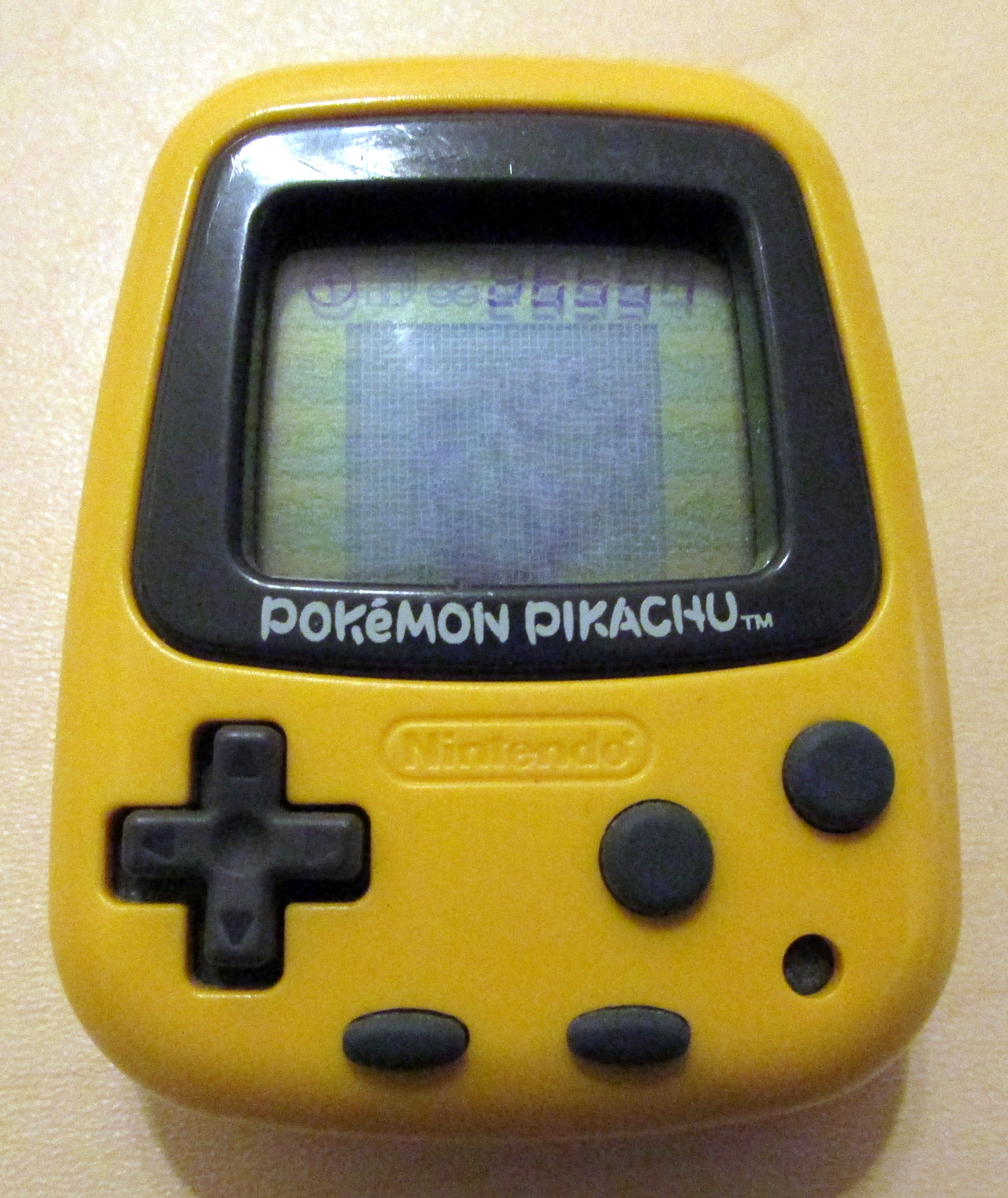
Pokémon Pikachu (1998)

Name	Release date	Manufacturer
Mattel Handheld Games original series	1976-1982	Mattel
Blip	1977	Tomy
Coleco Handheld Games	1978-?	Coleco
Merlin	1978-?	Parker Brothers
VTech Handheld games	1979-1991	VTech Palmtex
Game & Watch series	1980-1991	Nintendo
Astro Wars	1981	Grandstand
LCD Solarpower	1982	Bandai
Tiger Electronics Handheld Games series	1987-2003	Tiger Electronics
Acclaim Handheld Games series	1988-1991	Acclaim Entertainment
Barcode Battler	1991	Epoch
Nintendo Mini Classics	1998-present	Nintendo
Pokémon Pikachu	1998	Nintendo
Pokémon Pikachu 2	1999	Nintendo

== Retro style dedicated home consoles and handhelds (2001–present) ==
Retro styled dedicated video game consoles and handhelds are listed within the main article.

== See also ==
- List of best-selling game consoles
- List of video game console emulators
