= List of Japanese handheld electronic games =

This is a list of handheld electronic games, organized by manufacturer. It includes virtual pets, LCD games, and similar handheld devices released primarily in Japan.

== Games ==
Name	Japanese Name	Series	Manufacturer	Genre	Date
Onegai My Melody Mobile Phone	おねがいマイメロディ けいたいでんわ	My Melody	Agatsuma	Virtual Pet	2005
My Melody Melody Compact	マイメロディ メロディコンパクト	My Melody	Agatsuma	Virtual Pet	2006
FL The Block	FL ザ・ブロック		Bandai	Breakout clone	1981
LCD Game Digital	LCDゲームデジタル		Bandai	Shooter	?
Tamagotchi P's feat. Aikatsu! Set	Tamagotchi P's feat. アイカツ! Set	Aikatsu! / Tamagotchi	Bandai	Virtual Pet	2013
Aikatsu! Aikatsu Phone Smart	アイカツ! アイカツフォンスマート	Aikatsu!	Bandai	Virtual Pet	2013
Aikatsu! Aikatsu Phone Look	アイカツ! アイカツフォンルック	Aikatsu!	Bandai	Virtual Pet	2014
Aikatsu Stars! Aikatsu! Mobile	アイカツスターズ! アイカツ! モバイル	Aikatsu!	Bandai	Virtual Pet	2016
Wave UFO	ウェーブユーフォー		Bandai	V.Pet Battling	1997
Color Game Kids Series	カラーゲームキッズシリーズ		Bandai	V.Pet Battling	c. 2001
Kigurumi Kigumi~	きぐるみキグミ～		Bandai	V.Pet Battling	2005
Sumatomo	スマトモ		Bandai	Virtual Pet	2013
Super Barcode Wars	スーパーバーコードウォーズ		Bandai	V.Pet Battling	1992
Tamagotchi (series)	たまごっちシリーズ	Tamagotchi	Bandai	Virtual Pet	1996
Chiikawa to Issho	ちいかわといっしょ	Chiikawa	Bandai	Virtual Pet	2023
Tuttuki Bako	ツッツキバコ		Bandai	Other	2008
Digital Monster	デジタルモンスター	Digimon	Bandai	V.Pet Battling	1997-6-26
Digimon Pendulum	デジモンペンデュラム	Digimon	Bandai	V.Pet Battling	1998
Digivice	デジヴァイス	Digimon	Bandai	V.Pet Battling	1999
Digimon Accel	デジモンアクセル	Digimon	Bandai	V.Pet Battling	2005
Bandai LCD SOLARPOWER	バンダイ LCD SOLARPOWER		Bandai	Various	1982
Himitsu no Cocotama Cocotama Friends	ヒミツのここたま ここたまフレンズ	Cocotama	Bandai	Virtual Pet	2016
Fushigi Mahou Fun Fun Pharmacy Arudel's Small Bottle	ふしぎ魔法ファンファンファーマシィー アルデルの小びん	Fushigi Mahou Fun Fun Pharmacy	Bandai	Virtual Pet	?
Fushigi Mahou Fun Fun Pharmacy Tabisu's Loupe	ふしぎ魔法ファンファンファーマシィー タビスのルーペ	Fushigi Mahou Fun Fun Pharmacy	Bandai	Virtual Pet	?
PreCure Mobile LCD Pet Card Commune	ふたりはプリキュア 携帯液晶ペット カードコミューン	PreCure	Bandai	Virtual Pet	2004
PreCure Max Heart Heartful Commune	ふたりはプリキュア Max Heart ハートフルコミューン	PreCure	Bandai	Virtual Pet	2005
PreCure Max Heart Miracle Commune	ふたりはプリキュア Max Heart ミラクルコミューン	PreCure	Bandai	Virtual Pet	2005
PreCure Splash Star Excellent Series Crystal Commune	ふたりはプリキュア Splash Star エクセレントシリーズ クリスタルコミューン	PreCure	Bandai	Virtual Pet	2006
PreCure Splash Star Excellent Series Mix Commune	ふたりはプリキュア Splash Star エクセレントシリーズ ミックスコミューン	PreCure	Bandai	Virtual Pet	2006
Yes! PreCure 5 Pinky Catch	Yes!プリキュア5 ピンキーキャッチュ	PreCure	Bandai	Virtual Pet	2007
Yes! PreCure 5 GoGo! Transformation Mobile! CureMo	Yes!プリキュア5GoGo! 変身ケータイ!キュアモ	PreCure	Bandai	Virtual Pet	2008
Fresh PreCure! Transformation Mobile Notebook Linkrun	フレッシュプリキュア! 変身ケータイ手帳 リンクルン	PreCure	Bandai	Virtual Pet	2009
HeartCatch PreCure! Kokoro Pot	ハートキャッチプリキュア! ココロポット	PreCure	Bandai	Virtual Pet	2010
PreCure All Stars Pre-To-Phone	プリキュアオールスターズ プリートフォン	PreCure	Bandai	Virtual Pet	2012
PreCure Mobile Pre-To-Phone Doki Doki Plus	プリキュアケータイ プリートフォン ドキドキプラス	PreCure	Bandai	Virtual Pet	2013
DokiDoki! PreCure Magical Lovely Pad	ドキドキ!プリキュア マジカルラブリーパッド	PreCure	Bandai	Virtual Pet	2013
HappinessCharge PreCure! Cure Line	ハピネスチャージプリキュア! キュアライン	PreCure	Bandai	Virtual Pet	2014
Go! Princess PreCure Princess PreCure Lesson Pad	Go!プリンセスプリキュア プリンセスプリキュアレッスンパッド	PreCure	Bandai	Virtual Pet	2015
Witchy PreCure! Wrinkle Smart-hon	魔法つかいプリキュア! リンクルスマホン	PreCure	Bandai	Virtual Pet	2016
Kirakira PreCure a la Mode Welcome! To the KiraPati Shop	キラキラ☆プリキュアアラモード いらっしゃいませ！キラパティショップへ☆	PreCure	Bandai	Virtual Pet	2017
Hug! PreCure Various Jobs! PreCure Mirai Pad	HUGっと!プリキュア おしごといろいろ!プリキュアミライパッド	PreCure	Bandai	Virtual Pet	2018
Star Twinkle PreCure Take Care of Fuwa Twinkle Book	スター☆トゥインクルプリキュア おせわしてフワ☆トゥインクルブック	PreCure	Bandai	Virtual Pet	2019
Healin' Good PreCure Rabirin's Healing Room Bag	ヒーリングっど♥プリキュア ラビリンのヒーリングルームバッグ	PreCure	Bandai	Virtual Pet	2020
Tropical-Rouge! PreCure Mermaid Aqua Pot	トロピカル〜ジュ!プリキュア マーメイドアクアポット	PreCure	Bandai	Virtual Pet	2021
Magical Witches	マジカルウィッチーズ		Bandai	V.Pet Battling	1998
Space Invaders	インベーダーゲーム	Mame Game	Bandai	Shmup	1996
Pac-Junior	パックジュニア	Mame Game	Bandai	Arcade	1997
Crazy Climber	クレイジークライマー	Mame Game	Bandai	Arcade	1997
Galaxian	ギャラクシアン	Mame Game	Bandai	Shmup	1997
Bomberman	ボンバーマン	Mame Game	Bandai	Arcade	1997
Columns	コラムス	Mame Game	Bandai	Arcade	1997
Found in the Mame Game! Tamagotchi	マメゲームで発見！たまごっち	Mame Game / Tamagotchi	Bandai	Puzzle	1997
Found in the Mame Game! Tamagotchi 2	マメゲームで発見！たまごっち2	Mame Game / Tamagotchi	Bandai	Arcade	1997
Go! Go! Connie-chan Jaka Jaka Janken Puzzle	ゴーゴーコニーちゃん ジャカジャカジャンケンパズル	Mame Game	Bandai	Arcade	1997
Densha De Go!	電車でGO!	Mame Buru	Bandai	Arcade	1997
Trick Boarder	トリックボーダー	Mame Buru	Bandai	Arcade	1997
Bass & Float Fishing!	ブルッとフィッシング！	Mame Buru	Bandai	Arcade	1997
Final Furlong	ＦＩＮＡＬ FURLONG （ファイナルハロン）	Mame Buru	Bandai	Arcade	1998
Yokaiser	ヨーカイザー		Bandai	V.Pet Battling	1998
Legends Talispod	レジェンズ タリスポッド		Bandai	V.Pet Battling	2004
Yo-kai Watch Yo-kai Pad	妖怪ウォッチ 妖怪Pad	Yo-kai Watch	Bandai	Other	2015-1-17
Yo-kai Watch Yo-kai Pad S	妖怪ウォッチ 妖怪Pad S	Yo-kai Watch	Bandai	Other	2016-3-19
Ashita no Nadja Mobile Phone	明日のナージャのケイタイでんわ		Bandai	Virtual Pet	2003
Onmyou Taisenki	陰陽闘神機		Bandai	V.Pet Battling	2003
Phantom Thief Jeanne Petit Clair	神風怪盗ジャンヌ プティクレア	Phantom Thief Jeanne	Bandai	Virtual Pet	1999
Phantom Thief Jeanne Rosario Rouge	神風怪盗ジャンヌ ロザリオルージュ	Phantom Thief Jeanne	Bandai	Virtual Pet	1999
Bishoku-juu Hanteiki Gourmet Stick Sensor	美食獣判定器 グルメスティックセンサー		Bandai	V.Pet Battling	2011
Casio Game Digital	カシオゲームデジタル		Casio	Shooter	c. 1981
Bakuso Senki Metal Walker	爆走戦記メタルウォーカー		Capcom	V.Pet Battling	1998
Puyorin	ぷよりん		Compile	Shooter	1997
Dragon Quest Walking	ドラゴンクエスト あるくんです		Enix	V.Pet Battling	1998
EL-SPIRITS	EL-SPIRITS		Epoch	Shooter	?
Game Pokecon	ゲームポケコン		Epoch	Shooter	1985
Barcode Battler	バーコードバトラー		Epoch	V.Pet Battling	1991
Pocket Digicom	ポケットデジコム		Epoch	Shooter	?
Tetrin 55	テトリン55		Gametech	Shooter	1996
Invaders	インベーダー		Gakken	Shooter	1979
Heiankyo Alien	平安京エイリアン		Gakken	Shooter	1980
Shooting Watch (Schwatch)	シュウォッチ		Hudson	Shooter	1987
Teku Teku Angel (series)	てくてくエンジェルシリーズ	Teku Teku Angel	Hudson	V.Pet Battling	1997
Derby Ball	ダービーボール		Imagineer	V.Pet Battling	1998
Anpanman Melody Mobile Phone with LCD Animation	アンパンマン 液晶アニメつきメロディケータイ	Anpanman	JoyPalette	Other	2008
Anpanman Hello Outing Smartphone	アンパンマン もしもしおでかけスマートフォン	Anpanman	JoyPalette	Other	2015
Bemani Pocket (series)	beatmania pocketシリーズ	Beatmania	Konami	Rhythm Game	1998
Digimon	デジリーマン	Digimon	Konami	V.Pet Battling	2006
Dungeon Quest	ダンジョンクエスト		Konami	V.Pet Battling	1998
Pocket Biscuit	ポケットビスケッた		Marks	Virtual Pet	1997
Game & Watch (series)	ゲーム&ウオッチ	Game & Watch	Nintendo	Various	1980
Pocket Pikachu	ポケットピカチュウ	Pokémon	Nintendo	Virtual Pet	1998
Space Cobra Professional	スペースコブラ プロフェッショナル		Popy	Shooter	1982
Game Vision	ゲームビジョン		Sega	Shooter	?
Raise It! Mushiking	そだてて!ムシキング	Mushiking	Sega	V.Pet Battling	2006
Jewelpet Jewel Watch	ジュエルペット ジュエルウォッチ	Jewelpet	Sega Toys	Virtual Pet	2015
Jewelpet Jewel Pad	ジュエルペット ジュエルパッド	Jewelpet	Sega Toys	Virtual Pet	2014
Jewelpet Jewel Pod Premium Heart	ジュエルペット ジュエルポッド プレミアムハート	Jewelpet	Sega Toys	Virtual Pet	2014
Disney Characters Magical Pod	ディズニーキャラクター マジカルポッド	Disney	Sega Toys	Other	2015
Disney Characters Magical Me Pod	ディズニーキャラクターズ Magical Me Pod	Disney	Sega Toys	Other	2017-10-26
Disney Characters Princess Pod	ディズニーキャラクターズ Princess Pod	Disney	Sega Toys	Other	2019-06-27
Disney & Disney/Pixar Characters Magical Me Pad	ディズニー＆ディズニー/ピクサーキャラクターズ マジカル・ミー・パッド	Disney	Sega Toys	Other	2018-08-09
Cars 3 Shake and Action! Smartphone Drive	カーズ３ ふってアクション！ スマートフォンドライブ	Disney	Sega Toys	Other	2017-6-29
Lilpri Lil Character! Kuru Kuru Collection	リルぷりっ リルキャラ!くるくるコレクション	Lilpri	Sega Toys	Virtual Pet	2010
Rilu Rilu Fairilu Fairilu Magic Mirror	リルリルフェアリル フェアリル～魔法の鏡～	Rilu Rilu Fairilu	Sega Toys	Virtual Pet	2017
Rilu Rilu Fairilu Fairilu Camera	リルリルフェアリル フェアリルカメラ	Rilu Rilu Fairilu	Sega Toys	Virtual Pet	2016-4-28
Rilu Rilu Fairilu Fairilu Pad	リルリルフェアリル フェアリルパッド	Rilu Rilu Fairilu	Sega Toys	Virtual Pet	2016
Pichi Pichi Pitch Heart Fragment	ぴちぴちぴっち ハートのかけら		Takara	Virtual Pet	?
LCD Mobile Game of Life	液晶携帯人生ゲーム		Takara	Board Game	?
Disney & Disney/Pixar Characters Dream Toy Pad	ディズニー&ディズニー・ピクサーキャラクターズ できた!がいっぱい ドリームトイパッド	Disney	Takara Tomy	Other	2016
Oreca Battle Orekanpeki Device	オレカバトル オレカンペキデバイス	Oreca Battle	Takara Tomy	Other	2013
Oreca Battle Orekanpeki Device G	オレカバトル オレカンペキデバイスG	Oreca Battle	Takara Tomy	Other	2014
Kirarin Revolution Kira Toko	きらりん☆レボリューション きら☆トコ		Takara Tomy	Virtual Pet	2006
Shugo Chara! Amulet Shugo Tama	しゅごキャラ! アミュレットしゅごたま		Takara Tomy	Virtual Pet	2008
Sumikko Gurashi Sumikko Sagashi	すみっコぐらし すみっコさがし	Sumikko Gurashi	Takara Tomy	Virtual Pet	2020-5
Sumikko Gurashi Sumikko Catch	すみっコぐらし すみっコキャッチ	Sumikko Gurashi	Takara Tomy	Virtual Pet	2020-7
Sumikko Gurashi Sumikko Catch DX	すみっコぐらし すみっコキャッチDX	Sumikko Gurashi	Takara Tomy	Virtual Pet	2020-10
Sumikko Gurashi Sumikko Mikke	すみっコぐらし すみっコみっけ	Sumikko Gurashi	Takara Tomy	Virtual Pet	2021-10
Sumikko Gurashi Sumikko Water	すみっコぐらし すみっコウォーター	Sumikko Gurashi	Takara Tomy	Virtual Pet	2022-7
Sumikko Gurashi Sumikko Water DX	すみっコぐらし すみっコウォーターDX	Sumikko Gurashi	Takara Tomy	Virtual Pet	2022-10
Pet it! Walk it! Care by Changing! Sumikko Friend	すみっコぐらし なでて！あるいて！チェンジでおせわ！ すみっコフレンド	Sumikko Gurashi	Takara Tomy	Virtual Pet	2023-4
Pet it! Walk it! Care by Changing! Sumikko Friend Plus	すみっコぐらし なでて！あるいて！チェンジでおせわ！ すみっコフレンドぷらす	Sumikko Gurashi	Takara Tomy	Virtual Pet	2023-4
Care-filled Apps Plus - Sumikko Smartphone	おせわでいっぱいアプリがプラス すみっコスマホ	Sumikko Gurashi	Takara Tomy	Virtual Pet	2023-10-20
The world expands on a large screen! Sumikko Smartphone Wide	大きな画面で世界が広がる！すみっコスマホワイド	Sumikko Gurashi	Takara Tomy	Virtual Pet	2024-12
The world expands on a large screen! Sumikko Smartphone Wide Premium Set	大きな画面で世界が広がる！すみっコスマホワイド プレミアムセット	Sumikko Gurashi	Takara Tomy	Virtual Pet	2024-12
Sumikko Gacha	すみっコガチャ	Sumikko Gurashi	Takara Tomy	Virtual Pet	2025-3
Pretty Rhythm Smart Pod Touch	プリティーリズム スマートポッドタッチ	Pretty Rhythm	Takara Tomy	Virtual Pet	2012
Pretty Rhythm Smart Pod Shot	プリティーリズム スマートポッドショット	Pretty Rhythm	Takara Tomy	Virtual Pet	2013
PriPara Cyalume Miracle Pact	プリパラ サイリウムミラクルパクト	PriPara	Takara Tomy	Virtual Pet	2015
PriPara Pripass Idol Link	プリパラ プリパス アイドルリンク	PriPara	Takara Tomy	Virtual Pet	2014
Pocket Dream Console	ポケットドリームコンソール		Takara Tomy	Other	2006
DX Poké Ball DP	DXモンスターボールＤＰ	Pokémon	Takara Tomy	Other	2009-4-25
Pokémon BW Poké Ball	ポケモンＢＷ モンスターボール	Pokémon	Takara Tomy	Other	2011
Master Ball BW	マスターボールＢＷ	Pokémon	Takara Tomy	Other	2012-9-29
Got it! Poké Ball	ガチッとゲットだぜ！モンスターボール	Pokémon	Takara Tomy	Other	2019-11-16
Got it! Poké Ball Go!	ガチッとゲットだぜ！モンスターボールゴー！	Pokémon	Takara Tomy	Other	2021-7-17
Mega Throw! Poké Ball	めちゃナゲ！モンスターボール	Pokémon	Takara Tomy	Other	2022-11-18
Catch them in Battle! Poké Ball	ポケモン バトルでゲット！モンスターボール	Pokémon	Takara Tomy	Other	2024-4-20
Go with Pokémon! Poké Ball	ポケモンといっしょ！モンスターボール	Pokémon	Takara Tomy	Other	2024-11-2
Poke-Nade Poké Ball	ポケなで モンスターボール	Pokémon	Takara Tomy	Virtual Pet	2025-10-11
Pokédex	ポケモン図鑑	Pokémon	Takara Tomy	Other	2001
Pokédex Advanced	ポケモン図鑑アドバンス	Pokémon	Takara Tomy	Other	2003
Pokédex DP	ポケモン図鑑DP	Pokémon	Takara Tomy	Other	2007
Pokédex BW	ポケモン図鑑 ベストウイッシュ	Pokémon	Takara Tomy	Other	2011
Pokédex BW National Version	ポケモン図鑑BW ぜんこく版	Pokémon	Takara Tomy	Other	2011
Pokédex XY	ポケモン図鑑XY	Pokémon	Takara Tomy	Other	2014
Pokédex Z	ポケモン図鑑Z	Pokémon	Takara Tomy	Other	2015
Rotom Dex DX	ロトム図鑑ＤＸ	Pokémon	Takara Tomy	Other	2017-9-22
Get Ultra! Rotom Dex	ウルトラゲット！ロトム図鑑	Pokémon	Takara Tomy	Other	2018-09-15
Pokémon Pokédex Smartphone Rotom+	ポケモン図鑑 スマホロトム+	Pokémon	Takara Tomy	Other	2021-8-16
Link with camera! Pokémon Pokédex Smartphone Rotom	カメラでリンク！ポケモン図鑑 スマホロトム	Pokémon	Takara Tomy	Other	2023
You are also a Pokémon Professor! Pokémon Smartphone Rotom Pad	キミもポケモン博士！ スマホロトムPad	Pokémon	Takara Tomy	Other	2024-7
Pokémon Smartphone Rotom SHAKE	ポケモン スマホロトムSHAKE	Pokémon	Takara Tomy	Other	2025-7-19
Pokétch	ポケモンウォッチ	Pokémon	Takara Tomy	Other	2007-4
Pokétch Platinum Ver.	ポケモンウォッチ プラチナVer.	Pokémon	Takara Tomy	Other	c. 2008
Pokégacha	ポケでるガチャ	Pokémon	Takara Tomy	Other	2015-7-18
Pokémon Pad Pika-to Academy	ポケモンパッド ピカッとアカデミー	Pokémon	Takara Tomy	Educational	2019-3-21
Pri Chan Pritama GO	プリ☆チャン プリたまGO	Pri Chan	Takara Tomy Arts	Virtual Pet	2020-7
Virtual Masters Mushi Spirits	バーチャルマスターズ 虫スピリッツ	Virtual Spirits	Takara Tomy Arts	V.Pet Battling	2019-10-1
Virtual Masters Spirits	バーチャルマスターズ スピリッツ	Virtual Spirits	Takara Tomy Arts	Fishing	2016-11-10
Virtual Masters Spirits 360°	バーチャルマスターズ スピリッツ360°	Virtual Spirits	Takara Tomy Arts	Fishing	2019-10
Virtual Masters Spirits 360° PLUS	バーチャルマスターズ スピリッツ360°ＰＬＵＳ	Virtual Spirits	Takara Tomy Arts	Fishing	2019-10
Virtual Masters Spirits S	バーチャルマスターズ スピリッツS	Virtual Spirits	Takara Tomy Arts	Fishing	2021-7
Virtual Real Shooting Spirits	VRシューティング スピリッツ	Virtual Spirits	Takara Tomy Arts	Shooter	2017-7
Blip	ブリップ		Tomy	Sports	1977
Watchman	ウォッチマン		Tomy	Shooter	1981
Tomytronic 3D	トミー 3D立体グラフィックゲーム		Tomy	Various	1982
Me-mail (series)	ミメル		Tomy	Other	1998
Mirmo de Pon! Mirumiru Shot Fairy Call	ミルモでポン! ミルミルショット フェアリーコール	Mirmo de Pon!	Tomy	Virtual Pet	?
Mirmo de Pon! Wrist Pidia Heart Miru Mode	ミルモでポン! リストピディエ ハートミルモード	Mirmo de Pon!	Tomy	Virtual Pet	?
Mini Game Box (Series)	液晶ミニゲーム機		Yell	Other	?
