= Mini-Munchman =

1981 handheld electronic game

Mini-MunchMan
- Publisher: Grandstand
- Platform: Handheld
- Release: NA: 1981
- Genre: Maze

Mini-MunchMan is an LCD handheld electronic game that was released in 1981 in the UK by the manufacturer Grandstand. The game is a rebadged version of the Pac-Man clone Epoch-Man from Epoch.

In some markets, such as Australia, the game was badged "Mini-Arcade".

== Overview ==
Capitalising on the then-contemporary success of Namco's Pac-Man, the game was released in the same year as Grandstand's larger Munchman game and in the same yellow colour scheme (Conversely, Epoch Man is white). Mini-Munchman, however, is a pocket-sized device that includes additional features, such as a real-time clock, alarm, and stopwatch. The manufacturer later spawned a larger LCD version with greater screen area called Pocket Pac-Man.

== Hardware ==
The game uses a low consumption LCD-based screen, allowing for a small form factor design incorporating alkaline button power cells. The game requires two LR-44 or equivalent cells. In-game objects are displayed on fixed, immovable LCD elements. The main score display, which doubles up as a date/time and stopwatch display, consists of a three-and-a-half-digit display and an extra small digit for tenths of a second, or lives remaining.

== Gameplay ==
The object of the game is to move the character around a maze, eat all the fruit, and avoid contact with ghosts. There are two humpback bridges containing fruit items over and underneath the bridge. Each successive level is faster, increasing difficulty. Each level has a fixed route the player can follow to ensure completion without losing a life. The game tracks the player's score, with a maximum possible score of 1,999. Once this has been exceeded, the score will display as HHH.
