= Super micro computer =

This might refer to:

- A supercomputer or a mainframe computer built using microcomputer technology
- Super Micro Computer, Inc., an American computer hardware manufacturer that does business as Supermicro
- The Palmtex Portable Videogame System, later renamed and released as the Super Micro
