= Alien Attack =

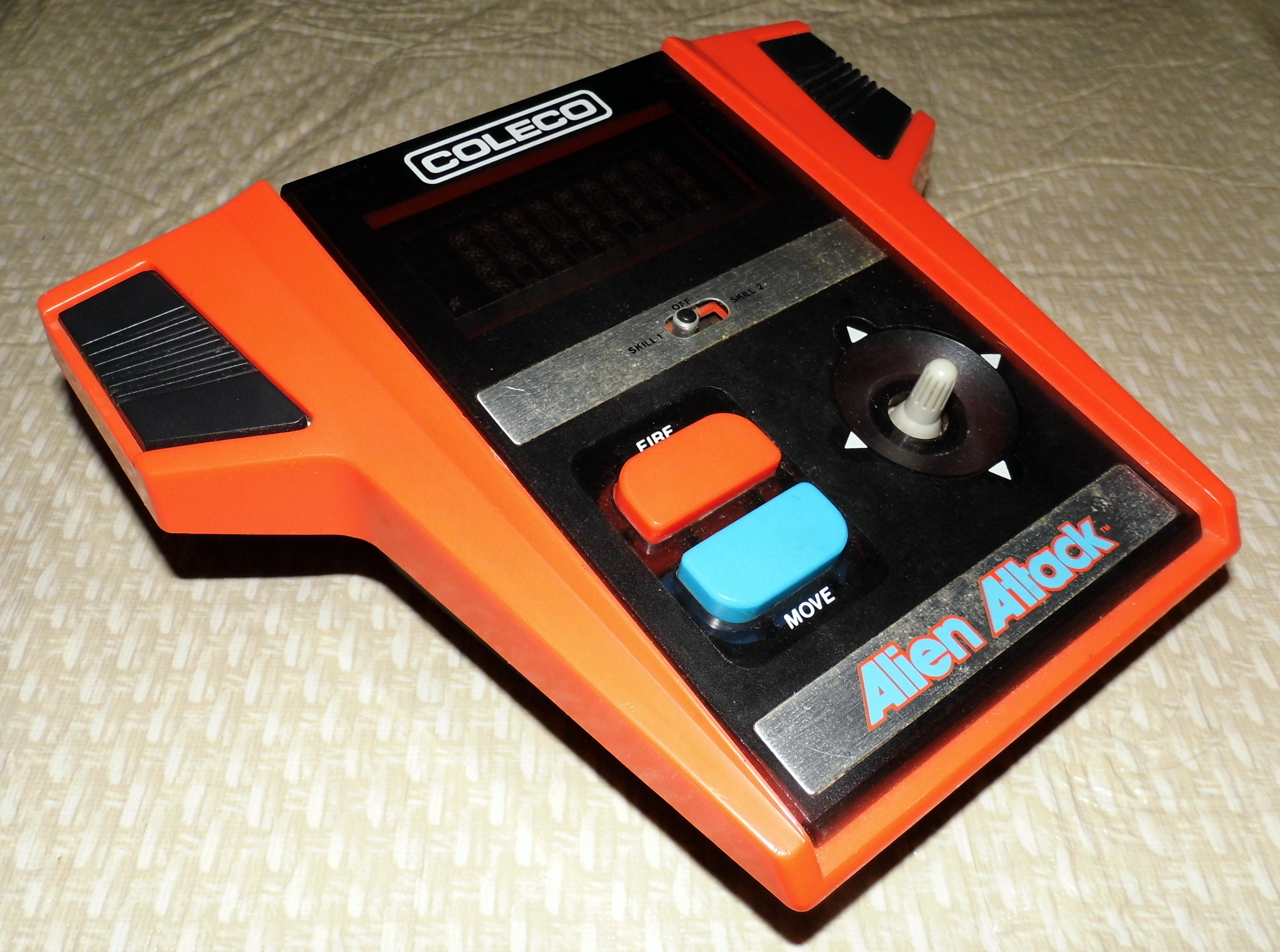
- Developer: Coleco
- Publisher: Coleco
- Platform: Handheld
- Release: 1981
- Genre: Multidirectional shooter
- Mode: Single-player

Alien Attack is a handheld electronic game made by Coleco and released in 1981. It uses a VFD display and is housed in a bright orange, futuristic-styled case. The controls are a joystick, fire button, and move button.

== Gameplay ==
The player's ship can fire in any direction by moving the joystick with the fire button pressed. Movement only occurs when the move button is pressed. Firing while moving is not possible. There is a grid of barriers representing a city that the player can use for cover.
