= My Boo =

My Boo may refer to:

- "My Boo" (Ghost Town DJ's song), 1996
- "My Boo" (CeCe Peniston song), 2000
- "My Boo" (Usher and Alicia Keys song), 2004
- "My Boo", a 2008 song by Girlicious, from the album Girlicious
- My Boo (album), a 2013 album by Ruslana
- My Boo, a 2013 virtual pet game, akin to Pou

== See also ==
- Boo (disambiguation)
