= Grandstand (game manufacturer) =

Electronics manufacturer

- Industry: Video games
- Number of locations: United Kingdom, New Zealand

Grandstand (also known as Grandstand Leisure Products) was a video game console and electronic game manufacturer and distributor. It was based in the United Kingdom and New Zealand and was active in the 1970s and 1980s.

== Overview ==
The company initially behind the "Grandstand" label was Adam Imports Ltd., (from 1980 Adam Leisure Group Ltd. and by 1983 Adam Leisure Group PLC) founded in 1973 by Chris Rycroft and Les Kenyon of Harrogate, UK. The company initially started as a mail order company and was the single largest supplier of calculators in the UK by 1974. By August 1978, George Bassett had acquired a 75% holding in the capital of Adam Imports for £750,000 cash, plus 60p in the pound of profits before tax in excess of £500,000 for year to December 31, 1978. Adam Imports was re-acquired from George Bassett by Chris Rycroft in 1980. It chiefly imported electronic products from other manufacturers such as VTech, Epoch, Tomy & Entex, selling them in the UK re-branded under the Grandstand name.

Some imported products' names were changed for the UK market. For example, the Tomy tabletop electronic game sold in the US as Pac Man (and in Japan as Puck Man) was released by Grandstand in the UK re-badged as Munchman.

== Products ==
Grandstand released numerous products over the years of which some are listed below. There were large numbers of similar variations, alternative names and model numbers typically referring to multiple evolutionary versions of the various game consoles and electronic games. Particularly, this is found with the Pong-type game consoles as the semiconductor technology rapidly progressed during the period that the Grandstand brand was active.

=== Video game consoles ===
==== Integrated pong consoles ====
UK Release Date	Image	Name	Format	Games	Developer	Made In
1977		Adman Grandstand T.V. Game 2000	Black & White	4 Games (Football, Tennis, Squash & Practice)	VTech	Korea
1977		Adman Grandstand T.V. Game 3000	Colour	4 Games (Football, Tennis, Squash & Practice)	VTech	Korea
1977-1979		Adman Grandstand T.V. Game 2600	Black & White	6 Games (Tennis, Football, Squash, Practice, Target 1 & Target 2)		Hong Kong
1977-1979		Adman Grandstand T.V. Game 3600	Colour	6 Games (Tennis, Football, Squash, Practice, Target 1 & Target 2)		Hong Kong
1977-1979		Adman Grandstand T.V. Game 3600-1	Colour	6 Games (Tennis, Football, Squash, Practice, Target 1 & Target 2)		Hong Kong
1977-1979		Adman Grandstand T.V. Game 2600 Mk. II	Black & White	6 Games (Tennis, Football, Squash, Practice, Target 1 & Target 2)		Hong Kong
1977-1979		Adman Grandstand T.V. Game 3600 Mk. II	Colour	6 Games (Tennis, Football, Squash, Practice, Target 1 & Target 2)		Hong Kong
1977-1979		Adman Grandstand T.V. Game 2600 Mk. III	Black & White	6 Games (Tennis, Football, Squash, Practice, Skeet & Target)		Hong Kong
1977-1979		Adman Grandstand Colour T.V. Game 3600 Mk. III	Colour	6 Games (Tennis, Football/Hockey, Squash, Practice, Skeet & Target)		Hong Kong
1977-1979		Grandstand Match Of The Day 2000	Black & White	4 Games (Tennis, Football/Hockey, Squash & Practice)		Hong Kong
		Grandstand Model 4600 Video Sports Centre Endorsed By Kevin Keegan	Colour	6 Games (Practice, Squash, Soccer, Tennis, Target & Moving Target)		Hong Kong
		Grandstand Model 4600 Deluxe Colour Video Sports Centre	Colour	6 Games (Practice, Squash, Soccer, Tennis, Target & Moving Target)		Hong Kong
		Adman Grandstand Model 5000	Colour	10 Games (Motor Cross, Enduro, Drag Race, Stunt Cycle, Practice, Squash, Soccer, Tennis, Target, Moving Target)		Hong Kong
		Grandstand Model 5000 Deluxe	Colour	10 Games (Motor Cross, Enduro, Drag Race, Stunt Cycle, Practice, Squash, Soccer, Tennis, Target, Moving Target)		Hong Kong
		Adman Grandstand Model 6000	Colour	10 Games (Basketball Practice, Practice, Tennis, Basketball, Squash, Hockey, Soccer, Gridball, Target Twin, Target Practice)		Hong Kong
		Grandstand Model 6000 Deluxe	Colour	10 Games (Basketball Practice, Practice, Tennis, Basketball, Squash, Hockey, Soccer, Gridball, Target Twin, Target Practice)		Hong Kong

==== Processor-cartridge based consoles ====
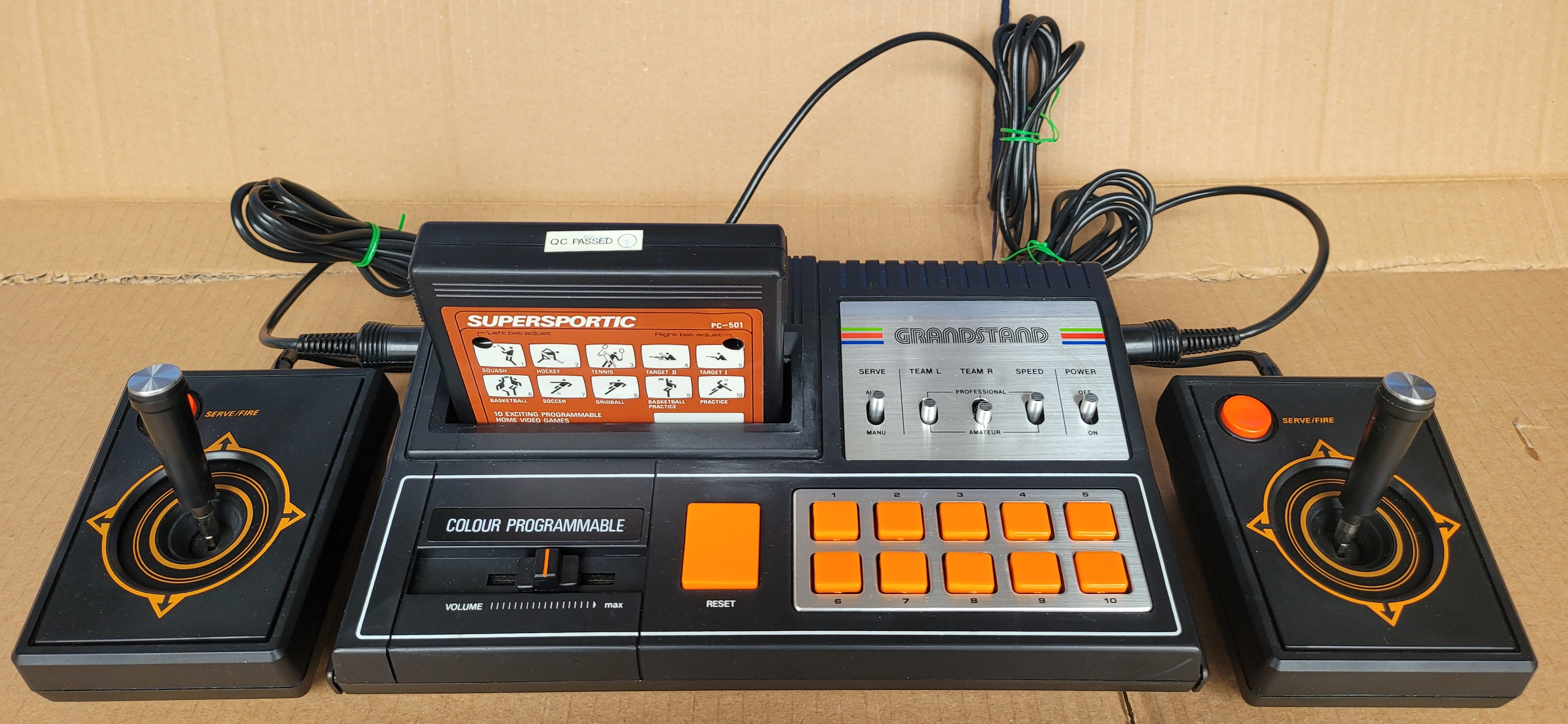
Colour Programmable (SD070)

Subsequently, the primitive cartridge-based Grandstand Colour Programmable video game console (sold in New Zealand as the Mark III Video Game) and several compatible Grandstand programmable video game cartridges were introduced. These consoles, belonging to the PC-50x Family, were still essentially Pong type affairs, but had a limited selection of cartridges available, each housing a different General Instruments processor chip AY-3-8xxx. This arrangement allowed for some variation in gameplay including the implementation of simple racing games featuring Pong-era graphics. However, these systems lack the flexibility found in later ROM cartridge based consoles, and there were never more than a few such processor-based cartridges released.

==== ROM-cartridge based consoles ====
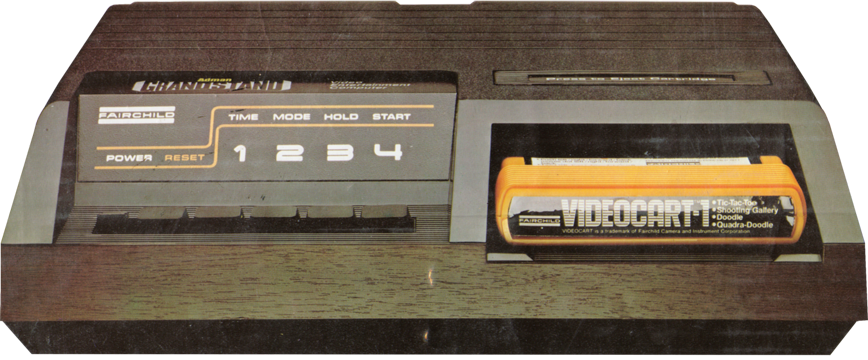
The Grandstand Video Entertainment Computer (Fairchild Channel F variant)

Later, the potentially more versatile ROM Cartridge based Fairchild Channel F was licensed, rebadged and released under the Adman Grandstand label as the Video Entertainment Computer in the UK (pictured). The company sold rebadged SG-1000s in New Zealand.. In New Zealand, Grandstand released an Arcadia 2001 clone, the Grandstand Video Master.

=== Tabletop electronic games ===
In the early 1980s Grandstand licensed several VFD-based tabletop electronic games from both Epoch and Tomy, including Astro Wars, Munchman, Caveman, Scramble, Firefox F-7, Alien Attack and The Big Game: Soccer.

UK Release Date	Image	UK Name	Developer	Original Name	Made In
1980		Invader from Space	Epoch	Invader from Space	
1981		Astro Wars	Epoch	Galaxy II	
1981		Munchman	Tomy	Puckman	
1981		The Big Game: Soccer	Epoch	Exciting Soccer Game	
1981		Tron	Tomy	Tron	
1982		Alien Attack	Tomy	Alien Attack	
1982		Caveman	Tomy	Caveman	
1982		Scramble	Epoch	Astro Command	
1983		Crazy Monster	Epoch	Zig-Zag Monster	
1983		Firefox F-7	Epoch	Astro Thunder 7	
1984		Star Force	Epoch	Star Force	

=== Handheld electronic games ===
Grandstand also produced LCD-based handheld electronic games such as Mini-Munchman, Scramble, Caveman and Crazy Kong (also released as Monster Panic).

In addition Grandstand released 4 different games (6 total including name variations), including BMX Flyer, in the Multicolorlaser 6000 series. Manufactured by Tomy these were licensed for sale in the UK and featured a multi-coloured backlit LCD.

=== Projector-based 'Light' games ===
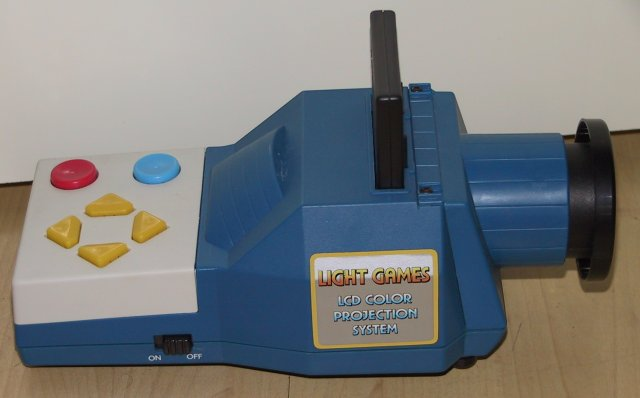
A Playtime Light Games console

The projector-based game system was developed by Hong Kong company Playtime Products, and was released in other regions where it is known as the Light Games Color LCD Projector. It was Playtime's only console to be sold. Fantastiko released the "PROJECTOR MEGA VIDEO GAME Color LCD system" in Italy in 1988, while Grandstand rebranded it as "Light Games LCD Colour Projection System" for the UK, and Hunter Caesar Toys (Defunct in 1996) released it for Australia. It is a tabletop projector-based machine with built-in controller, that runs games on small cartridges with LCD windows. Light would be directed through the LCD window and magnified onto a wall. The window was painted with a semi-transparent background and the black LCD would block the light from passing through. This provided 'big screen' entertainment and was a novelty at the time. The visual design and "animation" being projected from these game carts is somewhat reminiscent of Nintendo's popular Game & Watch series of electronic handheld game devices that consist of a segmented LCD being pre-printed with an overlay. The machine runs on D sized batteries and was available for sale in various parts of Europe including the UK. Thirteen games were developed for it.

=== Pinball Machines ===
==== Grandstand Pinball Wizard ====
In the mid-late 1980s Grandstand collaborated with Tomy to release the Grandstand Pinball Wizard, a rebranded version of Tomy's popular Tomy Astro Shooter Pinball, an electric wall-plug based pinball machine.

=== Accessories ===
Accessories were also marketed under the Grandstand name, such as the Universal Mains Adaptor.
