= Electronic Quarterback =

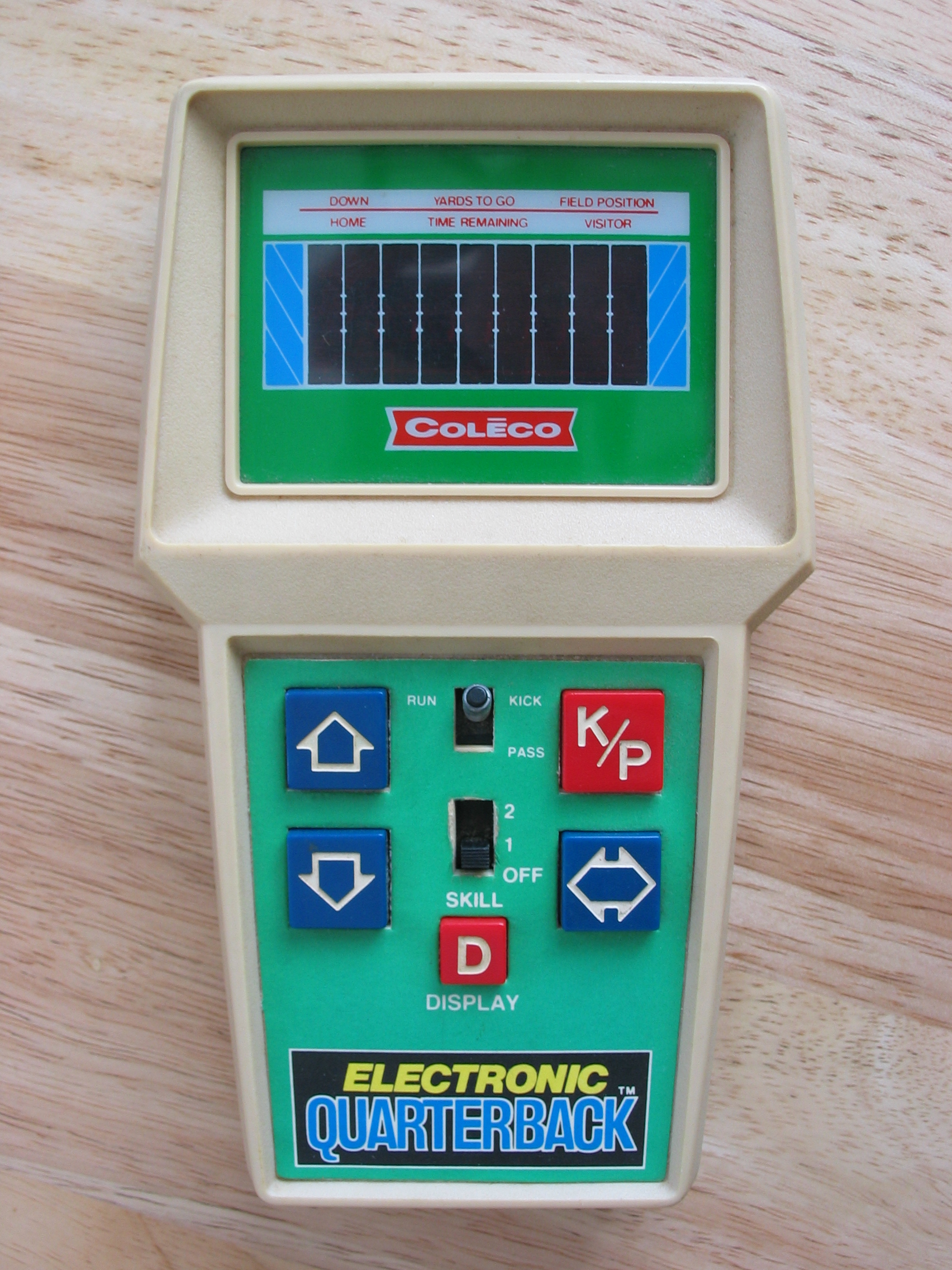
- Developer(s): Coleco
- Publisher(s): Coleco
- Platform(s): Handheld
- Release: 1978
- Genre(s): Sports

Electronic Quarterback is a handheld electronic game made by Coleco in 1978. It is powered by a 9-volt battery or an AC adaptor. It differentiated from similar handheld electronic American football games of the era, notably Mattel Electronics' version, by having two blockers and giving the quarterback the ability to pass.

Like many electronic games in the late 1970s, it was also released by Sears under their own brand and the name Electronic Touchdown.

== Gameplay ==
The game plays a simplified version of American football with three offensive players and either six or seven computer-controlled defensive players, depending on the player-selected difficulty. As implied by the game's name, the focus is on running and passing, though punting and kicking are possible. Kickoffs typically result in a touchback, with the following drive starting at the 20-yard line, but according to the game's instruction manual, occasionally the game allows a kickoff to be run back.
