= Munchman (tabletop electronic game) =

- Publisher: Grandstand
- Release: EU: 1981
- Genres: Maze

Munchman is a tabletop electronic game that was released under licence in 1981 in the UK by Grandstand. It is a rebadged version of the Tomy game known as Pac Man in the United States and Puck Man in Japan. The games are all based on Namco's Pac-Man arcade game and use a VFD screen.

== Hardware ==
The Munchman game runs on six volts DC and can be powered by four 'C' type batteries or alternatively via a low voltage mains adaptor. As the display is based on VFD technology, it allows bright, multicoloured in-game elements to be rendered but at the cost of a relatively small screen size. The VFD display is manufactured with the pre-formed, immutable in-game objects effectively fixed in place onto a dark background. Each element can be individually lit or unlit during play, giving the illusion of animation and movement. In-game objects cannot touch or superimpose one another, which is not ideal for a Pac-Man clone, as in the arcade version, the Pac-Man and ghosts do collide.

== Gameplay ==
The play area

As with most Pac-Man derived games, the player must guide the Pac-Man character around a maze, eating all of the dots whilst avoiding the ghosts. Notable features of this version are that the maze is small, containing only eighteen dots plus two power pills. Also, dots are only eaten if the player happens to move over them from right to left. There is a bonus cherry item sometimes available near the centre of the maze and horizontal warp tunnels can also be used by the player. The score is kept at the top of the display area, above the maze. There are two difficulty levels, "ama" and "pro", physically selectable by a switch.

== Reception ==
In the 21st century, the game has been described as "a weak version" of the Pac-Man arcade game. The elementary sound has been described as "shrill" and "beepy" and the sound during an active powerpill as "an irritating clicking noise". The graphics have also been criticised as the collisions are unrealistic because the ghosts and munchman can never occupy the same space. However, the product design has also been described as "gorgeous" and has been generally praised.

== See also ==
- Mini-Munchman
