= List of VTech handheld electronic games =

This is an (incomplete) list of electronic games released by VTech, along with their format and date of release, if known. See lists of video games for related lists. Starting in the early 1980s, VTech launched a series of portable and table top games that made use of LCD, VFD and LED displays.

Some of VTech's games were distributed in the US by Palmtex under their name, like the Tri-Screen Time & Fun series. The german Quelle mail-order store sold them under their own name as "Zeit & Spaß" (literally "Time & Fun").

== Models ==
Models in the VTech line of games
Title	Release	Series	Model no.	Box code no.	Manual code no.	Image	Notes
3D Gamate + Formula 500	1983	Electronic Programmable Games	80-0551	90-0185	91-0187 + ?		Game + cartridge
3D Gamate: Bonk	1983	Electronic Programmable Games	80-0559	?	?		Cartridge only
3D Gamate: Death Corridor	1983	Electronic Programmable Games	80-0550	?	?		Cartridge only
3D Gamate: Escape	1983	Electronic Programmable Games	80-0557	95-0128	91-0190		Cartridge only (released in blister-box)
3D Gamate: Flying Saucers	1983	Electronic Programmable Games	80-0560	?	?		Cartridge only
3D Gamate: Viking Invasion	1983	Electronic Programmable Games	80-0558	?	?		Cartridge only
Asterix: Bataille du Village	1984	Sporty Time & Fun	007124	?	91-0235		Released in France only (through Ludotronic)
Asterix: Chasse aux Sangliers	1984	Sporty Time & Fun	007125	90-0226	91-0236		Released in France only (through Ludotronic)
Backgammon Master	1983	Electronic intelligent LCD games	80-0424	90-0174	91-0184		
Banana	1981	Time & Fun	80-0173	90-0055	91-0064		
Baseball	1986	Electronic Talking	80-0922	?	91-0340		
Baseball	1984	Explorer Time & Fun	?	90-0188	?		
Bomb Fight	1982	Mini Time & Fun	80-0255	95-0096	91-0109		Released in blister-box
Bomb Fight	1982	Sporty Time & Fun	80-0244	?	?		Also released in blister-box (box code 95-0092)
Checkers Master	1983	Electronic intelligent LCD games	?	?	91-0186		
Chess Master	1983	Electronic intelligent LCD games	?	90-0175	91-0185		
Chicky Woggy	1982	Arcade Time & Fun	80-0247	90-0101	91-0105		
Chicky Woggy	1981	Electronic Tini-Arcade	80-0250	90-0106	91-0110		
Condor	1981	Time & Fun	80-0188	90-0065	91-0070		
Cops Chase	1982	Tri-Screen Time & Fun	?	?	?		Reskinned version of Mars Raid
Crazy Chewy	1982	Electronic Tini-Arcade	?	90-0091	91-0093		
Deep Diver	1982	Tri-Screen Time & Fun	?	90-0131	91-0138		Reskinned version of Deputy Den
Defendo	1984	Explorer Time & Fun	?	90-0187	91-0201		
Deputy Den	1982	Tri-Screen Time & Fun	?	90-0125	91-0127		Reskinned version of Deep Diver
Diamond Hunt	1982	Tri-Screen Time & Fun	7108	90-0122	91-0124		Reskinned version of Rabbit Hop
DiscoveryFact Attack!	1999	Discovery Channel	80-30600	?	?		
DiscoveryFact Reactor	1999	Discovery Channel	80-32900	?	?		
Dragon Castle	1981	Electronic Tini-Arcade	80-0251	90-0110	?		
Dragon Castle	1981	Arcade Time & Fun	?	90-0136	91-0130		
Dragon Castle	1982	Calculator Time & Fun	80-0235	90-0124	91-0126		
Electronic L.C.D. Bowling	1981		80-0130	?	?		
Engine Room	1984	Explorer Time & Fun	?	90-0186	91-0200		
Escape	1981	Time & Fun	80-0172	90-0054	91-0063		
Football	1986	Electronic Talking	80-0921	?	91-0341		
Game Burger	1987		31288	?	?		Japanese version of Mini Wizard
Game Machine	1980		80-0103	90-0025	91-0033		
Hippo Teeth	1982	Mini Time & Fun	80-0254	95-0095	?		Released in blister-box
Hippo Teeth	1982	Sporty Time & Fun	80-0243	90-0099	91-0103		Also released in blister-box (box code 95-0091)
Home Sweet Home	1982	Arcade Time & Fun	80-0320	90-0135	91-0142		
Home Sweet Home	1981	Calculator Time & Fun	80-0215	?	?		
Home Sweet Home	1981	Electronic Tini-Arcade	80-0249	?	?		
Hot Line	1982	Mini Time & Fun	80-0252	95-0093	91-0106		Released in blister-box
Hot Line	1982	Sporty Time & Fun	80-0241	90-0097	?		Also released in blister-box (box code 95-0089)
Invaders	1981		?	?	?		Also released as Sonic Invader
Isidoro & Sonja: Caccia al Ladro	1984	Mini Time & Fun	VG105	90-0234	91-0245		Released in Italy only (through Polistil)
Isidoro & Sonja: Cessate il Fuoco	1984	Mini Time & Fun	VG104	90-0233	91-0244		Released in Italy only (through Polistil)
Mars Raid	1982	Tri-Screen Time & Fun	?	?	?		Reskinned version of Cops Chase
Mini Game Machine	1979		?	?	?		
Mini Wizard	1987		80-0952	?	91-0342		Was later re-made, expanded, and re-released as the Talking Mini Wizard; which features 8 games.
Monkey	1981	Time & Fun	80-0171	90-0051	91-0059		
Monkey Jump	1982	Arcade Time & Fun	80-0218	90-0081	91-0097		
Night Flight	2000	Discovery Channel	80-40300	?	?		
Pancake	1981	Time & Fun	80-0174	90-0056	91-0065		
Pinball Wizard	1988	Talking	80-0988	?	?		
Pirate	1981	Time & Fun	80-0187	90-0064	91-0071		
Pro Screen + Death Corridor	1984	Electronic Programmable Games	80-0565	90-0218	91-0228 + 91-0230		Game + cartridge
Pro Screen: American Football	1984	Electronic Programmable Games	80-0568	?	?		Cartridge only
Pro Screen: Escape	1984	Electronic Programmable Games	80-0564	90-0219	91-0229		Cartridge only
Pro Screen: Formula 500	1984	Electronic Programmable Games	80-0566	90-0221	91-0231		Cartridge only
Pro Screen: Volcano Rescue	1984	Electronic Programmable Games	80-0567	?	?		Cartridge only
Pro Screen: Warpath	1984	Electronic Programmable Games	80-0569	?	?		Cartridge only
Rabbit Hop	1982	Tri-Screen Time & Fun	80-0313	90-0130	91-0137		Reskinned version of Diamond Hunt
Rally Racer	1988	Talking	80-1007	?	?		
Reversi Master	1983	Electronic intelligent LCD games	?	90-0172	91-0183		
Roller Coaster	1984	Explorer Time & Fun	?	90-0189	91-0203		
Safari	1981	Time & Fun	80-0186	90-0063	91-0072		
Sleep Walker	1981	Time & Fun	80-0185	90-0062	91-0073		
Soccer	1987	Electronic Talking	80-0982	?	91-0352		
Soccer 2	1979		?	?	?		2-player game, LED display
Soccer 3	1980		?	?	91-0034		2-player game, LED display
Space Blasters	1988	Talking	80-0996	?	?		
Super Soccer	1983	Tri-Screen Time & Fun	?	90-0162	91-0169		Reskinned version of Water Polo
Swifter	1991		?	?	91-0560		
Tennis Menace	1982	Mini Time & Fun	80-0253	?	91-0107		
Talking Mini Wizard Sequel to the Mini Wizard with 8 games.
Tennis Menace	1982	Sporty Time & Fun	80-0242	90-0098	91-0102		Also released in blister-box (box code 95-0090)
Variety + Burglar Alarm	1983	Programmable LCD Game	80-0571	90-0190	91-0194 + 91-0204		Game + cartridge
Variety + Past Invasions	1983	Programmable LCD Game	80-0561	90-0190	91-0194 + 91-0195		Game + cartridge
Variety + Super Soccer	1983	Programmable LCD Game	80-0570	90-0190	91-0194 + 91-0196		Game + cartridge
Variety: Man Eater	1983	Programmable LCD Game	80-0575	?	?		Cartridge only
Variety: Radioactive	1983	Programmable LCD Game	80-0574	?	?		Cartridge only
Variety: Ufo Factory	1983	Programmable LCD Game	80-0573	?	?		Cartridge only
Water Polo	1982	Tri-Screen Time & Fun	?	?	?		Reskinned version of Super Soccer
Wild Man Jump	1981	Electronic Tini-Arcade	80-0194	?	91-0078		
Wizard	1981		80-0121	?	?		Reissued in 1984 with the same model no.
