= Palmtex Portable Videogame System =

Handheld game console developed and manufactured by Palmtex

Palmtex PVS / Super Micro

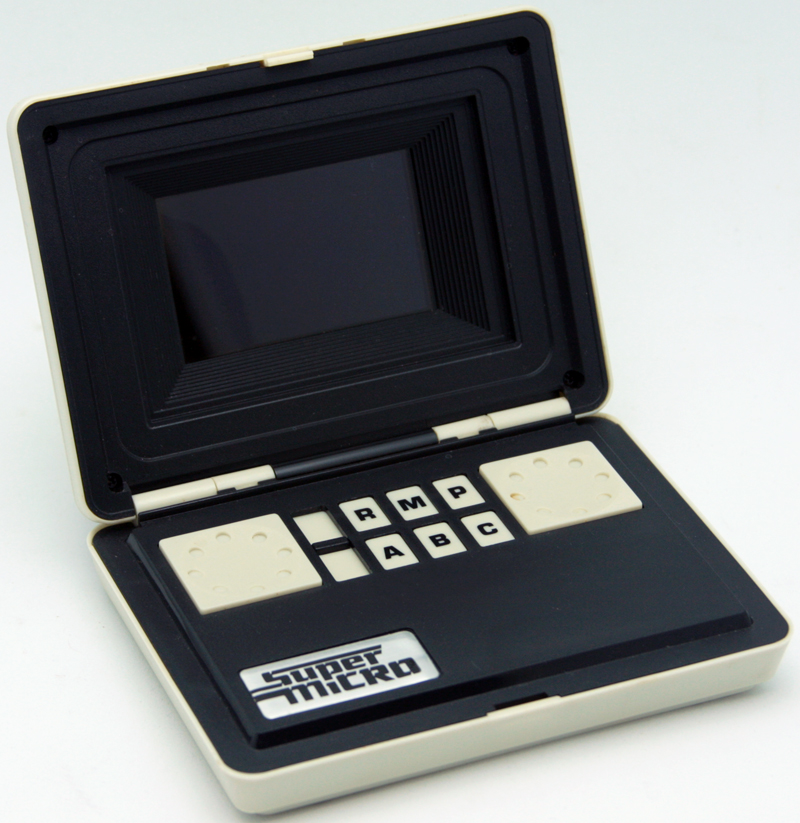
- Super micro branded console with cartridge and LightPak inserted
- Also known as: PVS Command Console
- Manufacturer: Palmtex
- Type: Handheld game console
- Generation: Second generation
- Released: 1984
- Introductory price: US$59.95 (Deluxe Pack) US$39.95 (Console) US$19.95 (LightPak) US$14.95 (Game)
- Discontinued: 1985
- Units shipped: 5,000
- Media: 4k ROM cartridge
- Memory: 2k RAM (inside cartridge)
- Display: LCD 32x16 57.15×38.1 mm
- Input: R/M/P/A/B/C buttons, 2 8-directional D-pads, contrast dial, power switch
- Power: 6 x AA batteries (4 x console / 2 x LightPak)

The Palmtex Portable Videogame System (PVS), later renamed and released as the Super Micro and distributed under the Home Computer Software name, is a handheld game console developed and manufactured by Palmtex, released in 1984.

The system was also referred to as the Palmtex Super Micro, because when the console was re-branded, the Palmtex logo was alongside Super Micro. However, Palmtex dropped its name from the packaging and promotional materials, in favor of its business partner, making its retail name the Home Computer Software Super Micro.

It had a number of quality and design issues. Only three games are known to have been released, it is possible that only one or more factory runs were made, and the existing units were liquidated and later sold through mail order with little to no advertising. As a result, it is now a rare collectible system, although working units are still extremely prone to breaking with normal use.

== History ==
Two different companies were involved with the console: Palmtex, who developed, manufactured and distributed it, and Home Computer Software, who developed its games. Palmtex Inc. was registered on November 12, 1980 in San Francisco, California. Home Computer Software Inc. was registered on January 14, 1983, in Sunnyvale, California. It recorded and distributed software on floppy diskettes.

=== Early operations ===
The company started with Esmail Amid-Hozour, a businessman that came to the United States in the early 80s. When looking for new business opportunities, he found electronic games, which were becoming popular in Japan, most notably the Game & Watch handhelds manufactured by Nintendo. He later managed to make a deal with Nintendo, who helped him import 300 handhelds to the US for a test market. The response was positive, and the units were sold without much trouble. Seeing this, Amid-Hozour founded Palmtex on March 22, 1982, which became the first company to distribute Nintendo consoles in the US. The handhelds distributed by the company were Fire Attack, Parachute and Turtle Bridge, with a later release adding Octopus, Donkey Kong and Snoopy Tennis.

Seeing the success of the Nintendo handhelds, the company began importing other handhelds like the Tri-Screen Time & Fun series by VTech to the United States. While the Game & Watch handhelds had normal Nintendo branding and packaging, the ones from VTech were re-branded to exclude the company's name from the console and packaging in favor of Palmtex.

At the end of 1982, the demand and sales of electronic handhelds was at its peak, so Palmtex decided to create their own video game system.

=== Development ===
On January 30, 1983, Palmtex announced the PVS, meaning "Palmsized Videogame System", making mention of its interchangeable cartridges, 3D effects due to several layers of glass providing depth, color graphics, sound control, and the inclusion of a pause button. The unit retailed for $30, while additional games were $20. It was described as a "dramatic design breakthrough" for handheld games.

Illustration of an early prototype with the Spell Bound cartridge inserted

In May 1983, more details about the console were revealed, showing an illustration of an early prototype, along with five game cartridges announced for the system and a brief description of each, Crystals of Morga, Star Trooper, Mayday!, Spell Bound, and Mine Field. The company hoped to have at least 12 different games including the five launch titles by the end of 1983, and to release the system by March or April 1984. However, by July 1983 the release date was pushed back to May 1984, and Palmtex advertised that those who bought the system would receive the game Spell Bound for free.

Originally, the game cartridges slid into the unit, compared to the final product where they clipped into the back of the screen. The name "PVS" was changed to mean "Portable Videogame System".

Palmtex also expected to release two new games each month for the system.

Palmtex signed a contract with Home Computer Software, led by Dan Shafer, to create the games for the console. They had developed other games for the Commodore 64 and Atari ST, and helped distribute the rare Atari 2600 game The Music Machine, which is a clone of Kaboom!, and the Family Bible Fun series of games by Sparrow Records. HCS hired Chuck Blanchard, who programmed React-Attack and Aladdin's Adventures, while an outside consultant created Outflank. This partnership helped the development of the console and its games progress smoothly.

In 1983, the Berlin Internationale Funkausstellung, at the time the biggest consumer electronics fair, took place from September 2 to September 11, and Palmtex wanted to showcase their system. The first prototype didn't fit inside of the unit, and to be functional the handheld had to be connected by an external cable to the breadboard hidden under the booth table. It had a transparent plastic casing, emphasizing the internals of the device.

By the end of 1983, the design was finalized, and was sent to National Electronics & Watch Co Ltd in Hong Kong for manufacturing, with the first batch of units being ready just in time for their next public appearance.

In 1984, Palmtex attended the Winter Consumer Electronics Show (CES), which took place from January 7 to January 10, 1984. Home Computer Software also attended the event.

Palmtex showcased the redesigned system, now with a white and black plastic case, alongside three launch games, Outflank, React Attack, and Aladdin's Adventures.

Home Computer Software showcased three games they were publishing, Kids Say The Darnest Things To Computers, Plaqueman, and Pro Golf.

=== Crash, liquidation, and bankruptcy ===
Even though development progressed and a final product was ready and available, the video game crash that had started the previous year was in full swing, leaving many disinterested in the market. The PVS became a victim of circumstance, and had a hard time presenting itself to distributors at the show.

That wasn't the only problem plaguing the system. A major design flaw presented itself during the demonstrations, in that the transparent screen was too dark, and needed a substantial natural light source behind it to be able to see and play the games, even during the day. This problem could be fixed, but in its current state, and with the market in a dire situation, no distributor was willing to carry the product, resulting in no orders being placed at CES.

Although it had been slated for release around May, the system was reported to have been released to the public for $49, with each additional game costing $15, sometime before January 26, according to the January 1984 issue of Popular Computing Weekly. However, this doesn't seem to have happened.

Palmtex searched for venture capital to continue funding for the project, but with the video game crash in full effect, the response was negative. This left the company without funding to improve the design of the console, and to many employees leaving the company.

Left with many existing units left from its production run, Esmail tried to sell existing stock through many means, including wholesaling, and even retailers from Asian countries who could liquidate its stock. After failing to secure a deal, Palmtex decided to liquidate the stock themselves.

In order to do so, they needed to make two changes. One was to fix the screen brightness issue, creating a simple light box to provide a back-light if one was needed, the LightPak. The other was a name change, choosing to go with "Super Micro" in order to appeal to the microcomputer market, which was booming in 1984. Complementing the new name, "Palmtex" was removed from all marketing and box art in favor of "Home Computer Software", to position it more closely to a computer. The information sticker on the bottom of the console still retained the Palmtex name. This meant that existing consoles and cartridges with the PVS branding had a "Super Micro" sticker applied over the old logo, while the new LightPak component had the Super Micro branding from the start.

The console was finally made available through mail order, costing $39.95 for the Super Micro, $14.95 for each game and $19.95 for the LightPak. A Deluxe Pack cost $59.95, including the console with the light-box and a game.

Even after this blunder, Home Computer Software was still developing more games for the system, but because Palmtex failed to pay a lump sum they owed after the delivery of the first three games, HCS stopped any further development on the new games, meaning the plan to release two new games each month didn't materialize.

Home Computer Software kept selling their games and advertising them in magazines, from December 1983 after filing trademark for their logo, and January, to at least September, but they never really recovered financially from the missed payment, leading the company to declare bankruptcy before the end of 1984.

In the end, both companies were suspended by the Franchise Tax Board at an unknown date.

The CEO of Palmtex, Esmail Amid-Hozour, went on to create Etón Corporation in 1986.

== Hardware ==
The console has three different components: the PVS itself, the game cartridge, and the LightPak.

The PVS (Model Number 9000-R1) uses a clam-shell design that opens and closes using a plastic clip on the front. The two halves of the system are connected by hinges and a flexible flat cable. The top half contains the cartridge port and a polarizing layer for the LCD, which is located in each cartridge. The bottom half contains the battery compartment for four AA batteries, and speaker.

The front of the console contains a power switch, two player controllers, which are D-pads with eight directions, and six buttons, R (reset), M (mute) which turns the sound on or off from the internal speaker, P (pause) to pause the game, and three action buttons A, B and C. On the back there is a contrast dial for the LCD.

The game cartridges contain the main processor and RAM, similar to the Microvision, as well as the monochrome 32x16 LCD with a color overlay with fixed sprites for the game graphics. They clip on the back of the display, and connect via 36 pins, with two 18-pin connectors on each side, and are necessary for turning on the console. The back of the cartridge contains a decal with the name of the console (PVS or Super Micro) and the name of the game.

The LightPak uses two AA batteries to power six light bulbs behind a textured diffuser to provide a back-light to the screen, and clips on top of the cartridge, enclosing it on its plastic shell. This is considered optional as it doesn't connect to the main circuit of the console like the cartridges do, and a room with adequate lighting makes it unnecessary for play, but the manual advises against direct sunlight.

The LightPak works by using the LCD to cover up the entire overlay of sprites with black squares (pixels), except the sprites being used at that moment. The light shines through the back of the translucent overlay and screen for visibility with either the light pack or ambient light.

=== Retail configurations ===
Each component of the console could be ordered separately, or a Deluxe Pack that included one Super Micro, one game cartridge, and one LightPak.

The packaging for both the Deluxe Pack and the games follows a unique code format, "A-x00x-B".

- A represents the first letter of the game included in the packaging.
- x00x could be either 100x, meaning it is included with the console, or 200x, meaning it is just the cartridge. The last number is the number of the game.
- B could either be P, indicating the console was inside (possibly meaning PVS or Palmtex), or C, indicating it was only the cartridge.

| Game | Game number | Deluxe Pack box code | Game box code |
|---|---|---|---|
| React Attack | 1 | R-1001-P | R-2001-C |
| Aladdin's Adventures | 2 | A-1002-P | A-2002-C |
| Outflank | 3 | O-1003-P | O-2003-C |

=== Hardware problems ===
The console is infamous for being of poor quality construction. The plastic is described as light and brittle. Due to the use of plastic clips during assembly of the cartridge and LightPak, as well as opening/closing the clam-shell design of the console, every time it is used, it seems at risk of breaking. The power switches also suffer from this problem. It is unknown if this problem existed since the launch of the console, or if age shrunk the plastic, turning it fragile.

The cartridges are also prone to breaking. The LCD can easily rot and the connections can break, improperly covering up the sprites during game-play, hindering the visuals of the game partially or completely. In other cases the game just stops working at all.

The LightPak is also easily broken - the light bulbs inside often come loose, making it lose some of its functionality. The battery compartment of the LightPak functions normally, but the one on the PVS has a problem where the cover needs to be inserted for the batteries to stay inside, and if the cover is closed all the way, it will be sealed shut, and require significant force to open, possibly scuffing or breaking the plastic.

== Games ==
Although five games had been announced with intentions to make more, none of the five were released. Instead, only the three new games showcased at CES are known to have been released: React Attack, Aladdin's Adventures, and Outflank.

=== React Attack ===
React Attack is a strategy game where the player needs to find the reactor in 48 different rooms, before confronting a terrorist to stop a nuclear meltdown. There's a time limit of 15 minutes before the player loses the game.

=== Aladdin's Adventures ===
In Aladdin's Adventures, the player controls Aladdin against an evil genie who is trying to steal his magic carpets.

=== Outflank ===
Outflank is a game of Reversi on an 8x8 grid, with three difficulty levels. The player can undo a wrong move and swap places with an AI during gameplay.
