= Blip (console) =

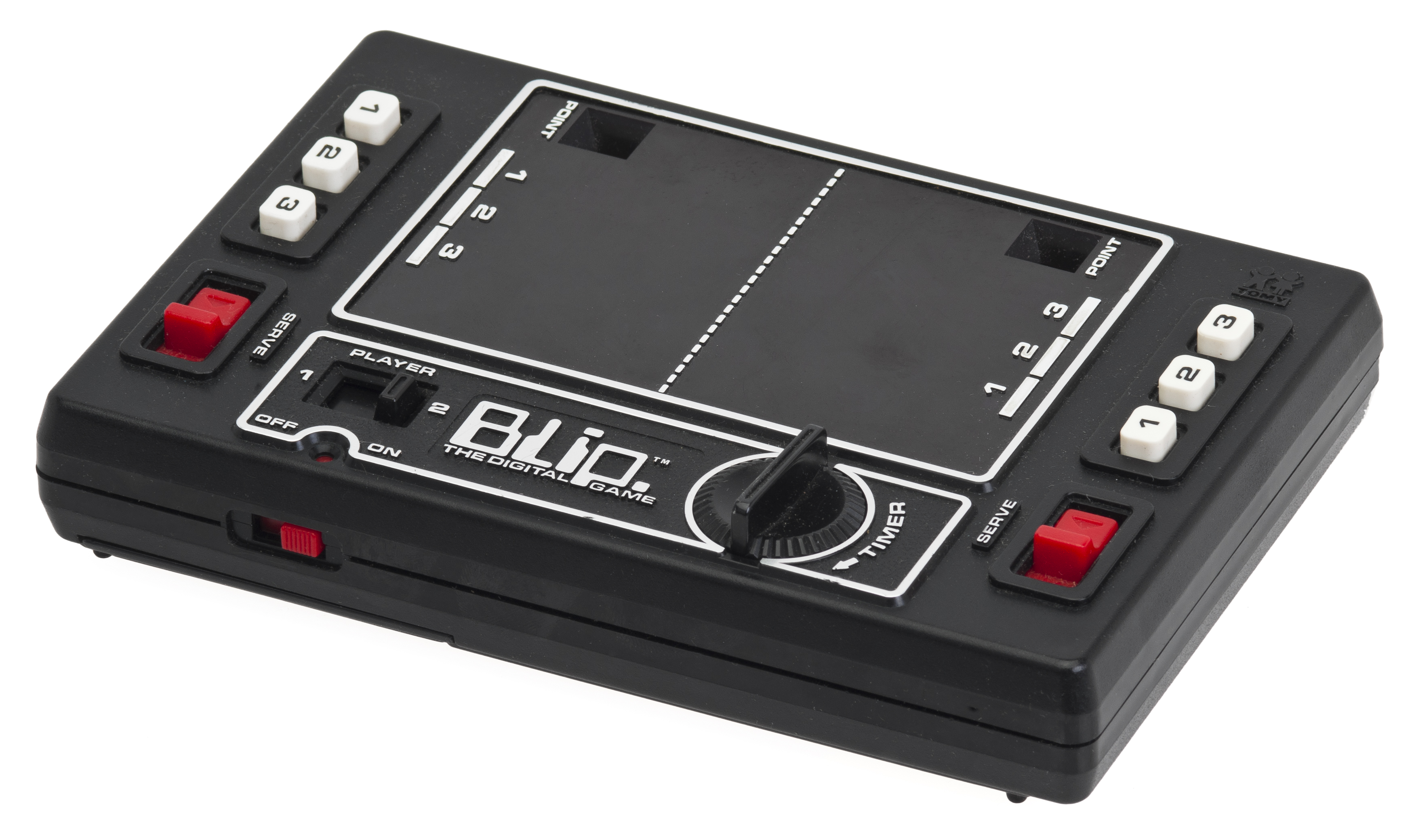
- Developer: Tomy
- Publisher: Tomy
- Designer: Hikoo Usami
- Release: 1977

Blip (stylized as Blip. THE DIGITAL GAME) is a tabletop electro-mechanical game marketed by Tomy starting in 1977 in the United States. The system can play a two-player game that is very similar to Atari's video game Pong, and a single-player game. In Germany, the system was sold under the name Blip-o-Mat. In Japan, the game was marketed as World Tennis.

== History ==
Blip was designed by Hikoo Usami for the Tomy Kogyo Co., the patent being filed in 1976 and awarded on December 19, 1977.

Tomy marketed Blip in the U.S. starting in 1977. In Japan, Blip was marketed as World Tennis and differed from the U.S. game by having the words "World Tennis" emblazoned on the screen and replacing the 1, 2, and 3 on the screen with silhouettes of tennis players. The Blip name remained on the Japanese version. In France, the game was marketed by Meccatronic. The German version was called Blip-o-Matic, although the Blip name remained on the case.

== Gameplay ==
The Blip shown with original box

For a two-player game, the game's selector switch is set to position 2 (for two players). The game is then turned on and the red LED ball lit up. Whichever side the ball is on serves first. The server's score counter is set to "0" while the receiver's counter was set to "R". The timer is then turned. A push of the "serve" button starts the game. The players must anticipate where the ball would land in one of three spaces on the "playing field" marked 1, 2, and 3. The player must then push the corresponding button before the ball "lands" on the space. If the player is successful in anticipating the ball's space and pushes the button in time, the ball is then "returned" to the opposing player. If the player anticipated wrongly, the ball stops and that player must then serve the ball, giving the opposing player 1 point.

Game play continues until either the timer stops or 10 points was earned by one of the players.

Blip is also capable of being played by a single person when the selector switch is set to position 1.

== Components ==
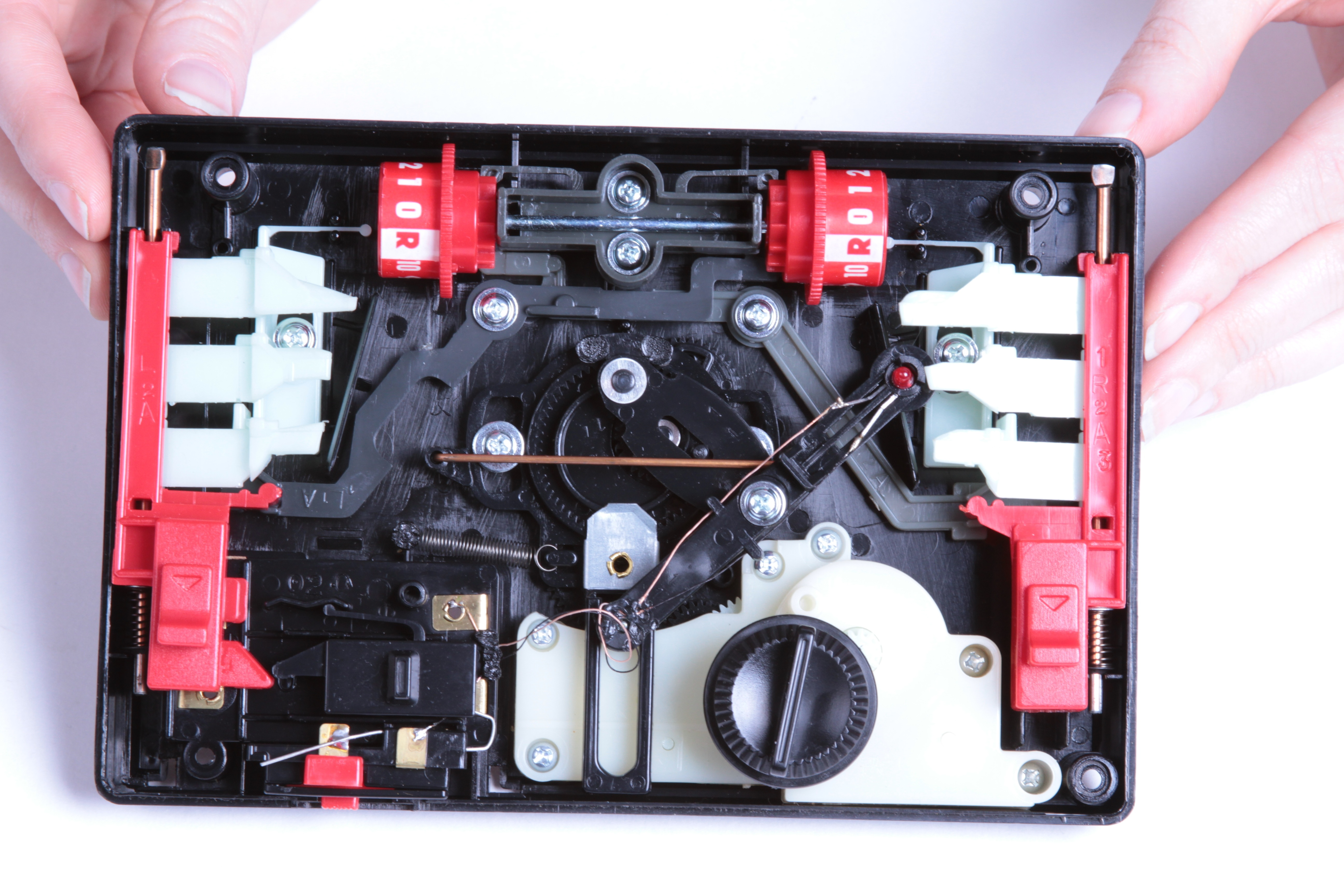
Interior of the toy

The game is housed in a plastic case with a translucent screen. On the screen is a dashed line dividing the screen in half (and simulating a net) and at either side are the three positions for the ball to land. The upper portion of the case also contains the three position buttons, the serve buttons, the player selector, and the timer dial. The underside contains the wheels to turn the score counters and the battery compartment.

It is the timer which provides the motor function to the game. Upon the timer dial being turned, a spring is wound which then, via several gears, drives the arm upon which the LED light (the ball) is mounted. The movement repeats after the ball hits each player's side 36 times, so it is possible to memorise the sequence of buttons to press.

The LED (and series resistor) is the only electrical component of the game, and is powered by two AA batteries. As a result, with sufficient ambient light the game is playable without batteries as one can see the unlit LED under the screen.

== Reviews ==
- Galileo
