= Handheld electronic game =

Device for playing interactive electronic games

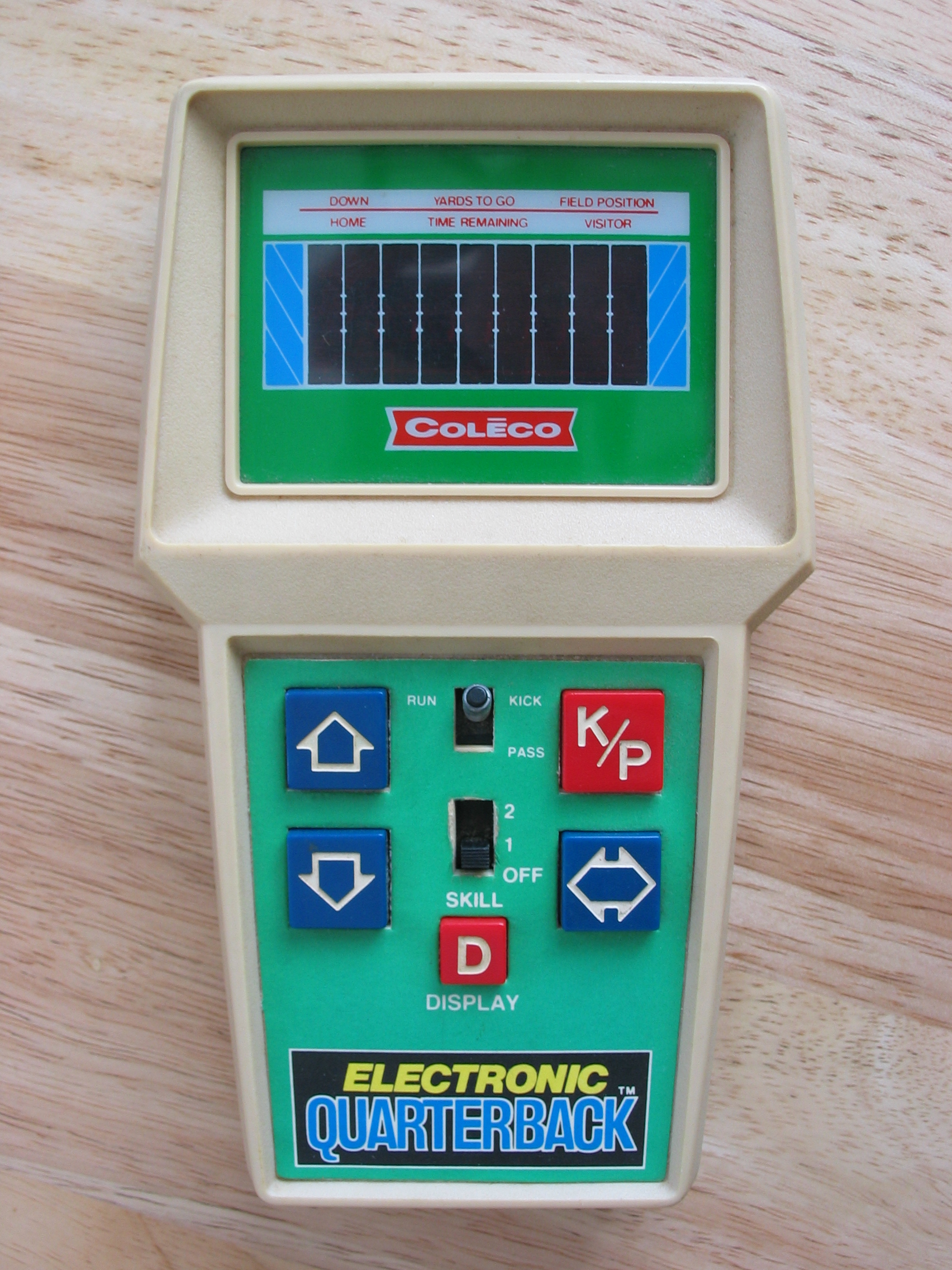
Coleco Electronic Quarterback (1978)

Handheld electronic games are interactive electronic games, often miniaturized versions of video games, that are played on portable handheld devices, known as handheld game consoles, whose controls, display and speakers are all part of a single unit. Rather than a general-purpose screen made up of a grid of small pixels, they usually have custom displays designed to play one game. This simplicity means they can be made as small as a smartwatch, and sometimes are. The visual output of these games can range from a few small light bulbs or LED lights to calculator-like alphanumerical screens; later these were mostly displaced by liquid crystal and vacuum fluorescent display screens with detailed images and in the case of VFD games, color. Handhelds' popularity was at its peak from the late 1970s into the early 1990s before declining. They are the precursors to the handheld game console.

== History ==
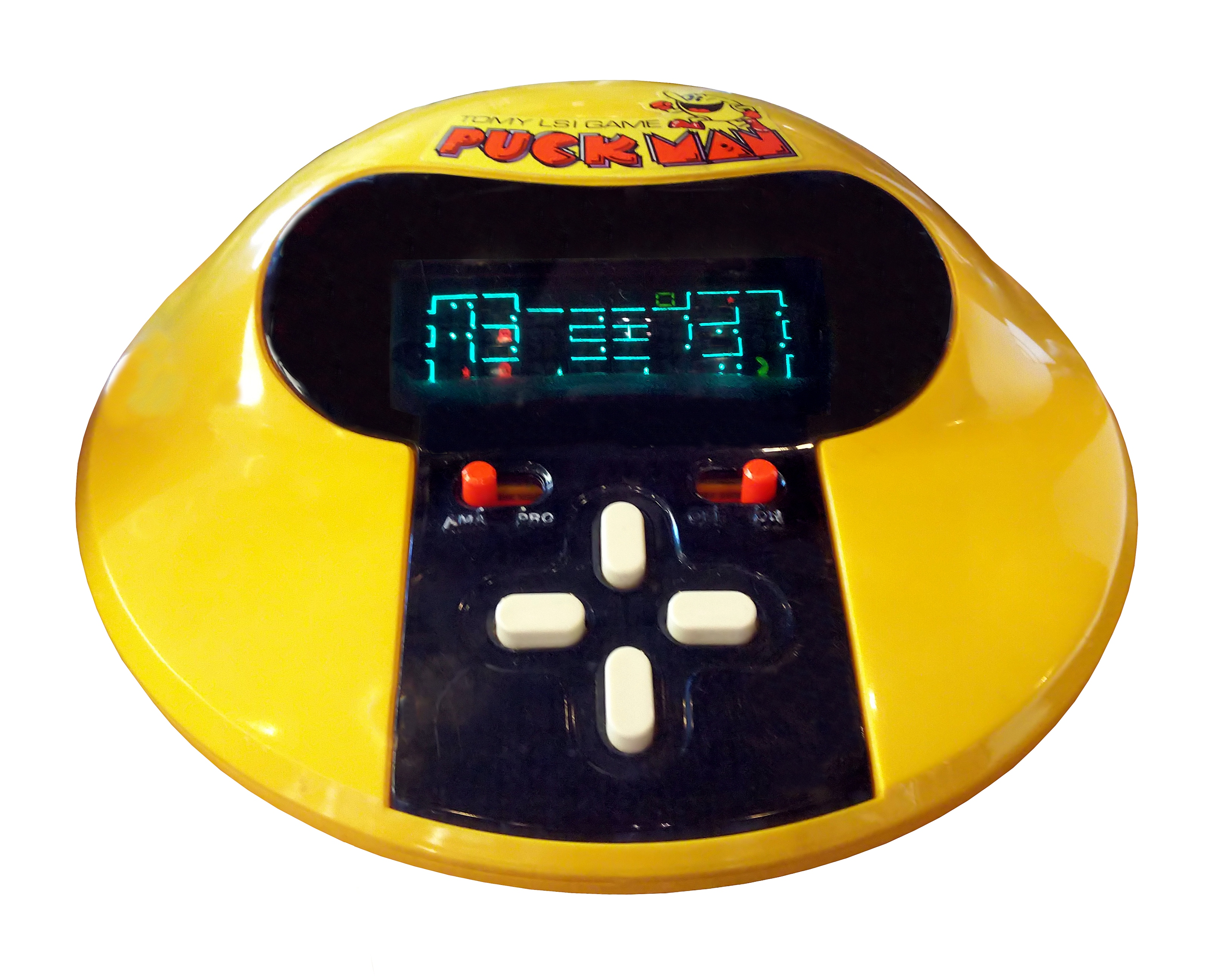
A variant of Pac-Man by the Japanese toy company Tomy from 1981. It was sold as Puck Man in Japan, the original Japanese name of the game.

Early handheld games used simple mechanisms to interact with players, often limited to illuminated buttons and sound effects. Mattel Auto Race (1976) and Mattel Electronic Football (1977), have simple red-LED displays; gameplay involves pressing buttons to move a car or quarterback icon (represented by a bright dot) to avoid obstacles (represented by less bright dots).

In 1978 the Milton Bradley Company entered the handheld market with Simon, a simple color-and-sound-matching game. Simon had no dedicated display, but featured four colored, lighted buttons; the original version was large enough to be used as a tabletop game or a handheld; later versions became increasingly smaller. The same year, Parker Brothers also released Merlin, a more sophisticated handheld which could play six different games using an array of 11 buttons with integrated LEDs. Despite their relative simplicity, each of these early games was highly successful.

The initial success of Mattel and Parker Brothers' entries spawned a wave of similar handheld devices which were released through the early 1980s. Notable among these were a series of popular 2-player "head-to-head" games from Coleco. Other games were miniaturized versions of popular arcade video games.

In 1979, Gunpei Yokoi, traveling on a bullet train, saw a bored businessman playing with an LCD calculator by pressing the buttons. Yokoi then thought of an idea for a watch that doubled as a miniature game machine for killing time, a game watch. Starting in 1980, Nintendo began to release a series of electronic games designed by Yokoi called the Game & Watch games. Taking advantage of the technology used in the credit-card-sized calculators that had appeared on the market, Yokoi designed the series of LCD-based games to include a digital time display in the corner of the screen. For later, more complicated Game & Watch games, Yokoi invented a cross shaped directional pad or "D-pad" for control of on-screen characters. Yokoi also included his directional pad on the Famicom game console's controllers, and the cross-shaped thumb controller soon became standard on game console controllers and ubiquitous across the video game industry as a replacement for the joystick.

During the 1980s, LCDs became inexpensive and largely replaced LED displays in handheld games. The use of custom images in LCD and VFD games allows for greater detail and eliminates the blocky, pixelated look of console screens, but not without drawbacks. All graphics are fixed in place, requiring every possible location and state of game objects to be preset—often visible when resetting a game—with no overlap. The illusion of movement is created by sequentially flashing objects between their possible states. Backgrounds for these games are static drawings, layered behind the "moving" graphics, which are transparent when not in use. Due to these limitations, the gameplay of early LCD games was often even cruder than that of their LED predecessors.

Some of the more well-known handheld games of the LCD era are the Game & Watch series by Nintendo and the games by Tiger Electronics, and many titles from other companies were also popular, especially conversions of arcade games. New games are still being made, but most are based on relatively simple card and board games.

=== Bandai LCD Solarpower ===
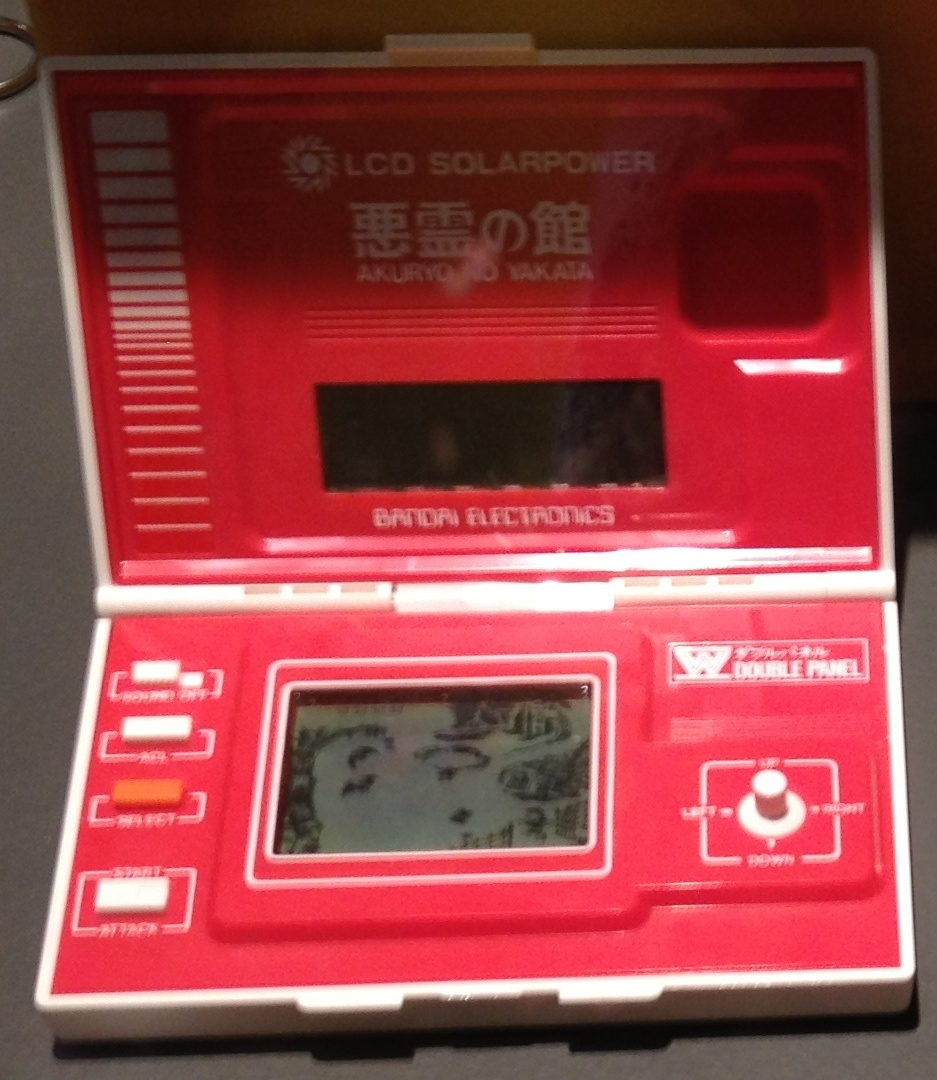
A double panel Bandai LCD Solarpower game

In 1982, the Bandai LCD Solarpower series were the first solar-powered gaming devices. Some of its games, such as the horror-themed game Terror House, have two LCD panels, one stacked on the other, for an early 3D effect. This also allows them to feature different stages more easily which would have been difficult or impossible to implement on a single panel. In 1983, Takara Tomy's Tomytronic 3D series simulated 3D by having two LED panels that were lit by external light through a window on top of the device, making it the first dedicated home video 3D hardware.

==== First series ====
Invaders of the Mummy's Tomb (謎のピラミッド, Nazo no Pyramid), ref. 16265 and 16813 for the re-release
Escape from the Devil's Doom (天国と地獄, Tengoku to Jigoku), ref. 16264
Sub Attack (激戦Ｕボート, Gekisen U-Boat) / (Sub Patrol in UK), ref. 16280
Break Out (大脱走, Daidassou), ref. 16282
Shark Island (恐怖の無人島, Kyofu no Mujintou), ref. 16281
Nazo No Chinbotsusen (謎の沈没船, Nazo no Chinbotsusen), ref. 16288, released in Japan only

==== Second series (double panel) ====
Amazone (秘境アマゾン, Hikyo Amazon), ref. 16815
Terror House (悪霊の館, Akuryo no Yakata), ref. 16814
Frankenstein (ミスターフランケン, Mr. Franken), ref. 16817
Airport Panic (エアポートパニック, Airport Panic), ref. 16818

== Handhelds today ==
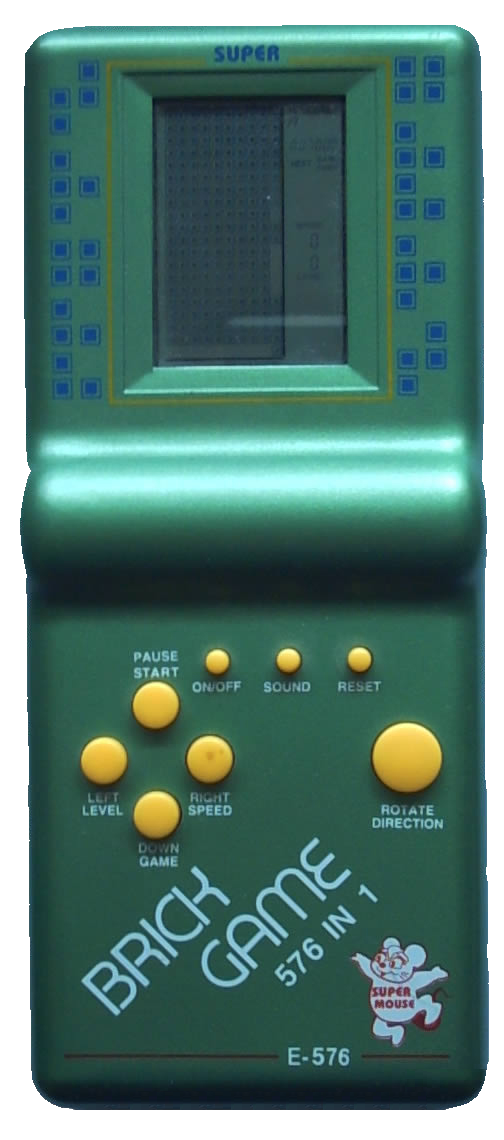
Brick Game

Despite the increasing sophistication of handheld consoles such as the Nintendo Switch, dedicated handhelds continue to find a niche. Among technophilic gamer subcultures like Akiba-kei, unique control schemes like that of the 2008 Tuttuki Bako have been proven salable due to novelty, but dedicated handhelds such as this are uncommon. Adult fads such as blackjack, poker, and Sudoku also spawn dozens of original and knockoff handheld games.

The Brick Game, originated in China and Russia in the early 1990s, includes games using a 10 × 20 block grid as a crude, low resolution dot matrix screen. Such devices often have many variations of Tetris and Snake, sometimes even other kinds of games like racing, Breakout or even shoot 'em up, such as those resembling Galaga or Battle City, where one block projects blocks at the "enemy" blocks. The most advanced of these designs usually have 26 distinct games sorted in alphabetical letters and feature multi-channel sound, voice synthesis or digital sounds samples, and internal CMOS memory which can save the current game progress and high scores when the system is turned off. Many of these handhelds with a dozen such games are marketed as having hundreds or even thousands of games (e.g. "9999 in 1"), though the vast majority are just different speed and difficulty settings. The most basic can now be sold as low as $1.

Another common game mode can be referred to as "avoid/catch the falling objects". These games are controlled with 2 movement buttons, and sport a screen with a column of player positions, and rows of projectiles to animate towards the player. The player and projectiles could be any picture, from tanks dodging missiles to a dog catching sausages.

In addition, although generally considered a virtual pet, Tamagotchi or similar handheld digital pets still fall under the category of handheld electronic games, which continue to be marketed to the consumer market.

== See also ==
- Calculator gaming
- Dedicated console
- Mobile game
