= Crandall =

Crandall is an English surname. It is likely a geographic feature name deriving from the Anglo-Saxon, "crundel," meaning hollow, ravine, or water-course.

== Notable people with the surname ==
- Bradley Crandall (1927–1991), American radio personality
- Bruce Perry Crandall (born 1933), American soldier and Medal of Honor recipient
- Charles Henry Crandall (1858–1923), American author and poet
- Charles M. Crandall (1826–1867), American physician and politician from New York
- Charles Martin Crandall (1833–1905), American inventor and toymaker
- Del Crandall (1930–2021), American baseball player and manager
- Duane Crandall (born 1946), Canadian politician from British Columbia
- Elizabeth Walbert Crandall (1914–2005), American academic
- Ella Phillips Crandall (1871–1938), American nurse
- Geno Crandall, American basketball player
- Harrison R. Crandall (1887–1970), American photographer and painter
- Harry Crandall (1879–1937), American businessman
- Horace C. Crandall (1896–1981), American politician from Nebraska
- J'aime Crandall (born 1982), American ballet dancer
- James Otis Crandall (1887–1951), American baseball player
- Jesse Armour Crandall (1834–1920), American inventor and toymaker
- John Crandall (1609–1676), early settler of Rhode Island
- John Gardner Crandall Jr. (1931–2008), American football coach
- Joseph Crandall (ca 1761–1858), Canadian Baptist minister and political figure in New Brunswick
- Keith A. Crandall (born 1965), American computational biologist, bioinformaticist, and population geneticist
- Lauren Crandall (born 1985), American field hockey player
- Lee Saunders Crandall (1887–1969), American ornithologist and General Curator of Bronx Zoo
- Louis Eugene Crandall (1929–2016), American printer and entrepreneur
- Lucien Stephen Crandall (1844–1889), American inventor
- Lynn Crandall (1888–1964), American civil engineer
- Martin Lesley Crandall (born 1975), American keyboardist
- Michael Grain Crandall (born 1940), American mathematician
- Orson Leon Crandall (1903–1960), American soldier and Medal of Honor recipient
- Prudence Crandall (c. 1803 – 1890), American schoolteacher and activist
- Rachel Crandall Crocker (born 1958), American psychotherapist and transgender activist
- Reed Leonard Crandall (1917–1982), American comic book illustrator
- Richard Crandall (1947–2012), American computer scientist and physicist
- Robert Lloyd Crandall (born 1935), American businessman
- Rodolph Crandall (1832–1922), American politician and soldier from Oregon
- Roland Crandall (1892–1972), American animator
- Russ Crandall (born 1980), American YouTuber and former food blogger
- Stephen Harry Crandall (1920–2013), American mechanical engineering professor

=== Fictional characters ===
- Captain Crandall, leader of Teamo Supremo
- Captain Rupert Crandall, Star Trek Capt in 24th Century
- Lt. Rip Crandall, character played by Jack Lemmon in The Wackiest Ship in the Army
- Lt. Dolores Crandall, character in Operation Petticoat
- Lennart Crandall, character in Johnny Cool
- Bob "Lightnin'" Crandall, character played by Bob Steele in Lightnin' Crandall
- Corky Crandall, character in sitcom Makin' It
- Sam Crandall, character in The FBI Story
- George Crandall (disambiguation), multiple characters
- Ellen Crandall, character played by Dorothy Neuman in Perry Mason, episode #44 "The Case of the Curious Bride"
- Jack Crandall, character played by Dwayne Hickman in My Dog, The Thief
- L.B. Crandall, character played by Ian Wolfe in That Way with Women
- Sheriff Vic Crandall, character played by Barry Kelley in sitcom Petticoat Junction
- Sheriff Lucky Crandall, character played by Russell Hayden in A Tornado in the Saddle
- Sir Crispin Crandall, character played by Harris Yulin, The Blacklist, episode "Sir Crispin Crandall"
- Monte Crandall, character played by James Ellison in The Ghost Goes Wild
- Lawrence and Betty Crandall, characters played by Harry Hayden and Donna Martell in Abbott and Costello Meet the Killer, Boris Karloff
- Jim Crandal, character played by James Britton in The Yesterday Machine
- Judge Crandall, character played by Kevin McCarthy (actor) in ABC TV The
- Midnight Hour
- Peggy Crandall, mentioned in movie The Last Time I Saw Archie

== See also ==
- Crandall v. Nevada (1868), U.S. Supreme Court case
- Crandell (disambiguation)
