= Crandall (disambiguation) =

Crandall is a Scottish surname.

Crandall may also refer to:

== Places ==
- Crandall, Georgia, U.S.
- Crandall, Indiana, U.S.
- Crandall, South Dakota, U.S.
- Crandall, Texas, U.S.
- Crandall Peak, Victoria Land, Antarctica

== Other uses ==
- Crandall University, Canada
- Crandall cabs, a B–unit locomotive conversion
- Crandall syndrome, rare congenital disorder

== See also ==
- Crandall House (disambiguation)
- Crandell (disambiguation)
- Crannell (disambiguation)
- Crendell, a hamlet in Dorset, England
- Crandall v. Nevada, a U.S. Supreme court case
