= Labyrinth (marble game) =

Game of skill using a maze with holes

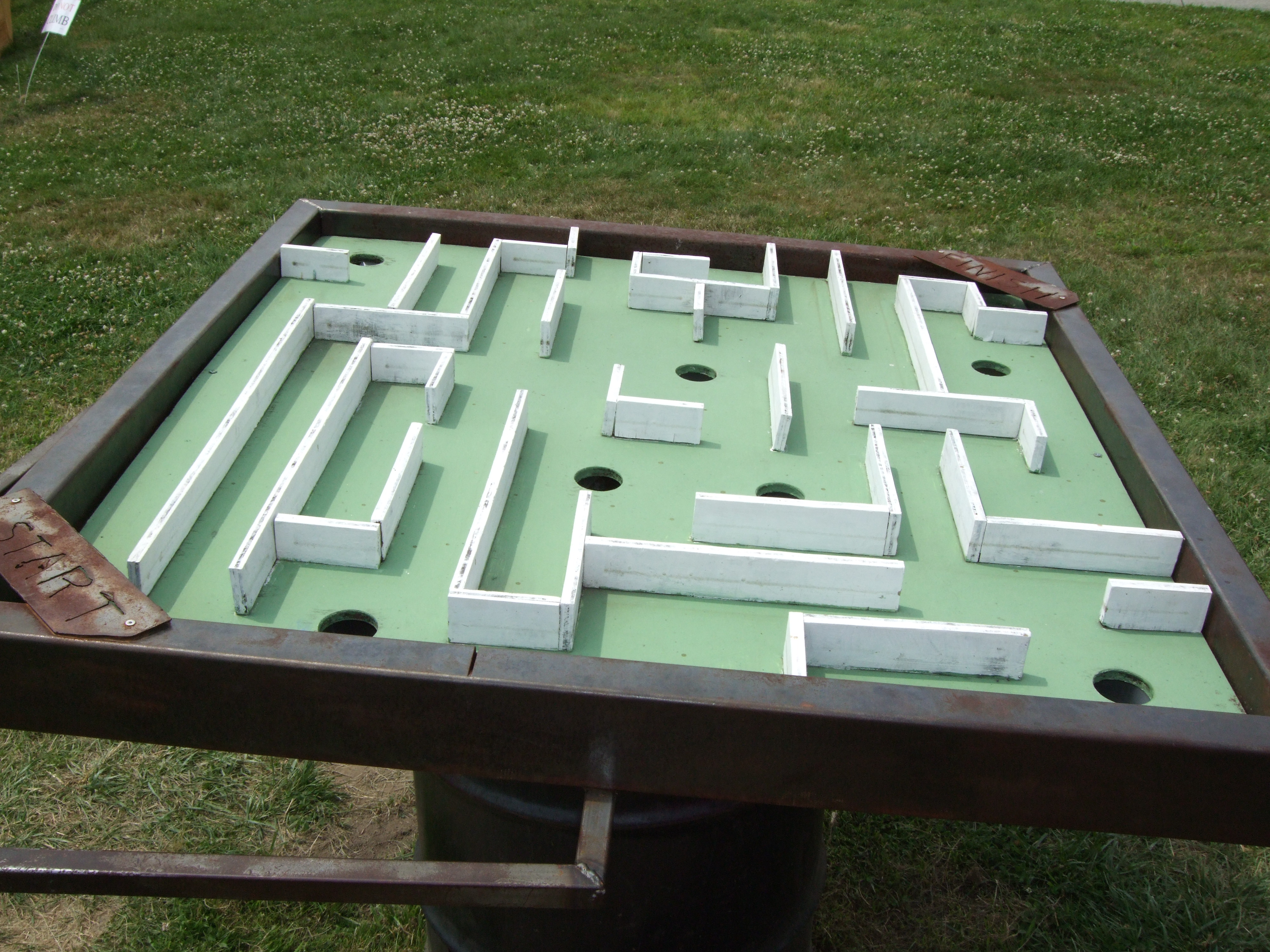
- A miniature golf hole in the style of a large Labyrinth game, from the 2009 FIGMENT arts event
- Manufacturers: BRIO
- Publication: 1946
- Genres: Skillful
- Players: 1
- Setup time: none
- Playing time: varies
- Chance: no
- Age range: 3 and up
- Skills: hand-eye coordination
- Website: https://www.brio.us/products/by-age/6-years-and-up/labyrinth

Labyrinth is a game of physical skill consisting of a box with a maze on top with holes, and a steel marble. The object of the game is to try to tilt the playfield to guide the marble to the end of the maze, without letting it fall into any of the holes. Some versions of the game feature a suspended maze surface that rotates on two axles, each of which is controlled by a knob. Small handheld versions of the game are sold, with the box being completely closed with a transparent cover on top.

The game was developed by BRIO in Sweden and first released there in 1946. It was introduced to the United States by BRIO around 1950. Similar games are offered in the US by a number of companies, due to it never being properly copyrighted there (according to one such company).

== Reception ==
Games magazine included Labyrinth in their "Top 100 Games of 1980", describing it as "like walking a tightrope without the element of danger".

== See also ==
- Ball-in-a-maze puzzle
- List of maze video games

Rotating:

- Cameltry
- Lazy Raiders

Inside-out 360 degrees:

- Rubik's 360
- Perplexus

Third-person:

- Marble Madness
- Super Monkey Ball
- Marble Blast Gold
- Neverball
- GooBall
