= Crandell =

Crandell is typically a surname. It may refer to:

== People ==
- Alexandra Crandell (born 1987), American fashion model and television personality
- Bradshaw Crandell (1896–1966), American artist and illustrator
- Chad Crandell (born 1975), American football player
- Crandell Addington (born 1938), American entrepreneur and poker player
- Dwight Crandell (1923–2009), American volcanologist
- Marion G. Crandell (1872–1918), American war worker killed in World War I
- Marcus Crandell (born 1974), Canadian football player
- Todd Crandell (born 1966), American triathlete
- Brad Crandell (1927-1991), American radio personality

== Other uses ==
- Crandell Theatre, built by Walter S. Crandell, located in the Village of Chatham, New York
- Crandell Park, Eaton County, Michigan; also has a Crandell Lake
- Mount Crandell, Alberta, Canada, named after Edward H. Crandell; also has a Lake Crandell

== See also ==
- Crandall (disambiguation)
- Crandelles
- Crannell (disambiguation)
- Crendell
