= Charles Crandall =

Charles Crandall may refer to:

- Charles Henry Crandall (1858–1923), American author and poet
- Charles Martin Crandall (1833–1905), American inventor and toy-maker
- Charles M. Crandall (1826–1867), American medical doctor and politician from New York
