= Crannell =

Crannell may refer to:

- Crannell, California
- Annalisa Crannell, American mathematician, daughter of Carol Jo
- Carol Jo Crannell, American astrophysicist, mother of Annalisa
- Todd Crannell, American sports agent
- Bartholomew Crannell Beardsley (1775-1855), lawyer, judge and political figure in Upper Canada and New Brunswick
- Florence Crannell Means (1891-1980), American writer for children and young adults
- Robert Crannell Minor (1839-1904), American artist

== See also ==
- Crandell (disambiguation)
