= John Crandall =

Personal details
- Born: 15 February 1618 Westerleigh, Gloucestershire, England
- Died: 29 November 1676 (aged 58) Newport, Rhode Island
- Spouse(s): (Mary) (7 children); Hannah Gaylord (2 children - 2)
- Children: John Crandall; James Crandall; Jane Crandall; Sarah Crandall; Peter Crandall; Joseph Crandall; Samuel Crandall; Jeremiah Crandall; Eber Crandall

Elder John Crandall (15 February 1618 – before 16 January 1675/76) was a Baptist minister, born in Westerleigh, Gloucestershire, England and was one of the founding settlers of Westerly, Rhode Island.

== Biography ==
=== English roots ===
Crandall was born in 1618 (baptized February 15, 1617/8) in Westerleigh, Gloucestershire, England to James Crandall, a yeoman of Kendleshire in that parish, and his first wife Eleanor. The name was probably taken from Crundelend in Abberley, Worcestershire, where people bearing the name were concentrated in the 16th century. Crandall's great-grandfather Nicholas Crundall (died 1589) of Tewkesbury, Gloucestershire came to south Gloucestershire in 1572 as the vicar of the parish of Winterbourne. Nothing else is known of John Crandall's life in England prior to his emigration to America, except that his relatives started spelling the name "Crandall" around 1610.

=== In America ===
The first documentation for Crandall in America is in 1643 when he appears as a grand jury member in Newport. He became a prominent member of the First Baptist Church in Newport, and subsequently the first elder of the denomination at Westerly, Rhode Island. He went to Lynn, Massachusetts with John Clarke and Obadiah Holmes to hold services for the Baptists; he was arrested there on July 21, 1651 and sent to prison in Boston. Ten days later, he was convicted of breaking the law by holding services and fined five pounds, in default of which he was to be publicly whipped. He was released upon his promise to appear at the next term of court. In January 1674/75, he came under the scrutiny of Connecticut civil and religious authorities for preaching Baptist doctrines and baptizing three men at New London.

In 1655, he was a freeman of Rhode Island; he was a representative for Newport to the General Court of Commissioners (the legislative body) in 1658-59 and 1662–63. He signed a letter with eight others to the court of commissioners of Rhode Island dated August 27, 1661 in relation to a tract of land at Westerly where they desired to settle. He and Joseph Torrey were appointed commissioners on May 14, 1669 to treat with Connecticut concerning the jurisdiction of disputed territory, and the colony of Rhode Island gave him 35 shillings to pay his expenses to Connecticut.

On November 18, 1669, he received a letter from the governor and assistants of Connecticut complaining that he and others had appropriated a large tract of land belonging to Stonington, Connecticut. He and Tobias Saunders answered the complaint on behalf of the Westerly people. He was conservator of the peace at Westerly in 1670, and deputy to the general assembly again in 1670-71. The Connecticut authorities arrested him on May 2, 1671, but the Rhode Island government advised him not to give bond and promised to pay his expenses and defend him.

He had at least seven children by his first wife, who died August 2, 1670. His second wife was Hannah Gaylord (born 1647), daughter of William and Ann (Porter) Gaylord of Windsor, Connecticut. She died in 1678. He died at Newport, where he had moved in 1675 because of King Philip's War.

== Descendants ==
Crandall's children were: John, James, Jane who married James Babcock, Sarah who married Josiah Witter, Peter whose wife's name was Mary, Joseph who married Deborah Burdick, Samuel who married Sarah Colby (or Celbey), Jeremiah, and Eber. He is the ancestor of a number of prominent Americans, including Charles Henry Crandall, James Otis Crandall, Jesse Armour Crandall, Lucien Stephen Crandall, Orson Leon Crandall, Prudence Crandall, Reed Crandall, Robert Crandall, and Roland Crandall. Others include Lucille Ball, Katharine Hepburn, Julia Child, Ruth Benedict, Garrison Keillor, and Frances Folsom Cleveland, wife of President Grover Cleveland, Caleb Rawn Crandall, Nettie Virginia Crandall Bunt, Rawn Michael Bunt and Stephanie Marie Bunt.

- List of early settlers of Rhode Island
- Colony of Rhode Island and Providence Plantations
