= Figment =

Figment may refer to:

- Figment (Disney), Disney character
- Figment (arts event), arts event
- Figment (website), website
