= Dan Klitsner =

American inventor

Dan Klitsner is the founder and creative director of toy inventing and licensing firm KID Group LLC.

Klitsner has invented and licensed several number one hit toys, including Bop It, Perplexus and Hyper Dash. His inventions have been the recipients of over two dozen awards nominations, 2 gold IDEA Awards and 4 Toy Association Toy of the Year Awards. He also co-founded QiGo Inc., which utilized USB Key technology to support child-safe internet connection for toys.

Klitsner has served as a judge in a number of design and innovation competitions, including the IDSA international design competition, the Consumer Electronics Show, and the Toy of the Year Awards.

In 2022, Klitsner honored the 25th-anniversary of Bop It! with its latest iteration, “Bop It! Button” where a single-button version of the toy calls players to “Bop It,” “Don’t Bop It,” “Do Bop It,” “Do Not Bop It.”

== Awards ==
2021 Toy and Game International Excellence Awards, Innovative Art and Design Visuals of the Year, Perplexus Snitch

2015 Toy Association Toy of the Year Awards, Game of the Year, Simon Swipe

2013 Toy Association Toy of the Year Awards, Game of the Year, Perplexus Epic

2009 Creative Child Creative Toy Awards, Top Toy of the Year, Hyper Dash

2008 Toy Association Toy of the Year Awards, Electronic Entertainment Toy of the Year, Power Tour Guitar

2003 Toy Association Toy of the Year Awards, Vehicle of the Year, Air Hogs Regenerator RC

1999 IDEA Award Keytop Toys

1997 Duracell Toy Award, Bop It
