= Perplexus =

Ball-in-a-maze puzzle

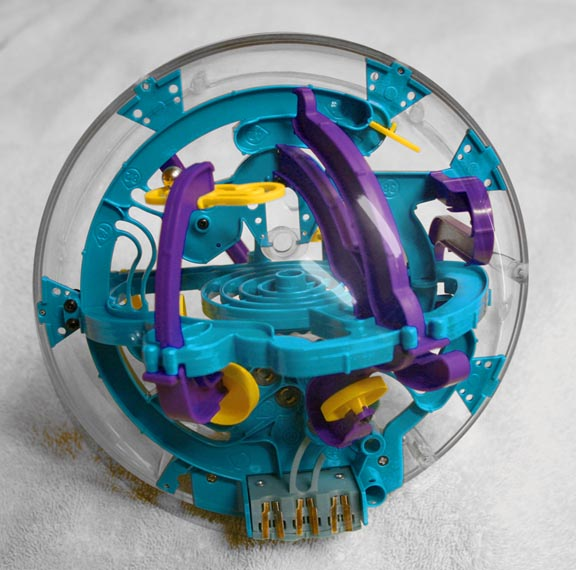
- The "Superplexus" ball
- Type: Ball-in-a-Maze Puzzle
- Invented by: Michael McGinnis, Brian Clemens, Dan Klitsner
- Company: Perplexus LLC
- Country: United States
- Availability: 2000–Present
- Official website

Perplexus, originally released as Superplexus, is a 3-D ball-in-a-maze puzzle or labyrinth game enclosed in a transparent plastic sphere. It is created by Dan Klitsner, the creator of several oher toys such as Bop It. By twisting and turning it, players try to maneuver a small steel ball through a complex maze along narrow plastic tracks. The maze has many steps (varying across puzzles). The number of steps ranges from 30 in the Perplexus Twist to 225 in the Perplexus 3x3 Rubik's cube Hybrid. Some levels drop the ball into a cup or a small rim to utilize its 3-D nature. Players must complete obstacles varying in difficulty to reach the end.

Perplexus LLC is the manufacturer and a wholly owned subsidiary of Spin Master Ltd (since 2017).

== History ==
Perplexus was co-invented by college professor Michael McGinnis and toy inventors Brian Clemens and Dan Klitsner of San Francisco-based KID Group—known for inventing Bop It, HyperDash, and other game titles. McGinnis first drew pictures for 3-D labyrinths in the late 1970s. In 1999, he showed drawings and rough prototypes to Clemens and Klitsner. After a year of collaboration and many prototypes, they perfected the toy's gameplay. It was easy enough for a young child to start, yet challenging any age for its many levels.

== Versions ==
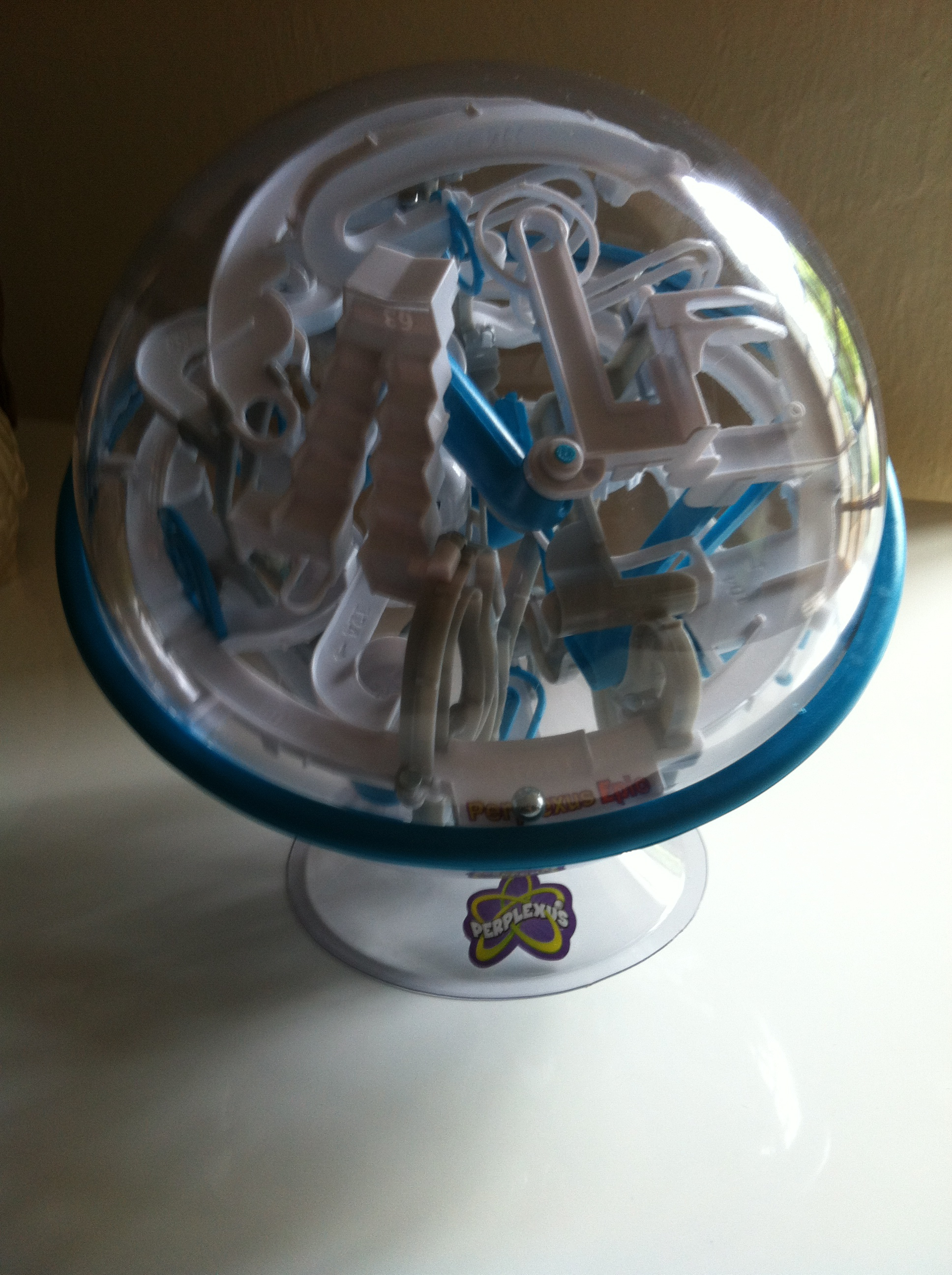
Perplexus Epic

There are currently 28 versions of Perplexus:

- Original (re-branded as Beast in 2019)
- Rookie (re-branded as Rebel in 2019)
- Epic
- Twist
- Warp
- Perplexus Giant
- World's Smallest: Original
- World's Smallest: Twist
- World's Coolest: Teeter
- World's Coolest: Spiral
- World's Coolest: Cascading Cups
- Death Star
- Q-Bot
- Drakko
- Mini Spiral
- Mini Cascading Cups
- Prophecy (recolor/rethemed Rookie/Rebel design)
- LightSpeed
- Go! Spiral
- Go! Stairs
- Go! Snitch
- Sidewinder
- Twisted
- Revolution Runner (has a motor with four settings and a button to start/stop the turning depending on the setting)
- Rubik's Hybrid (modeled after the 2x2 Rubik's cube)
- Rubik's Fusion (modeled after the 3x3 Rubik's cube, but only rotates on one axis)
- Portal (track switching gimmick using three different buttons)
- The Mandalorian, the newest design.

Some of the various designs have been released with colour variations. One example is Rookie which was rereleased with a yellow colour.

=== Rubik’s Tracks ===
The latest rebrand/recolour is a whole new line using previously existing designs. Currently they are four different versions though the numbering/difficulty naming scheme suggests a fifth design in the easiest level.

- Level 1: none
- Level 2: Rubik’s Tracks 70 (Rookie/Rebel)
- Level 3: Rubik’s Tracks 100 (Original/Beast)
- Level 4: Rubik’s Tracks 125 (Epic)
- Level 5: Rubik’s Tracks 150 (Portal)

=== Superplexus ===
Inside the Superplexus ball

In 2001, the first globally produced design called Superplexus, launched with limited availability. This version has an electronic timer and sounds. This is the same obstacle that eventually became “Original” under the Perplexus brand.

=== a~!mini ===
Released in 2004, this is the very first design that made it to the production stage, however it was only ever available in Japan for a very short period. Though it is quite a small and simple design it is sought out by collectors due to its legacy in shaping the Perplexus brand.

== See also ==
- Ball-in-a-maze puzzle
- Rubik's 360
- Rolling ball sculpture
- Rubik's Cube
