= Ball-in-a-maze puzzle =

Dexterity puzzle involving a ball in a maze

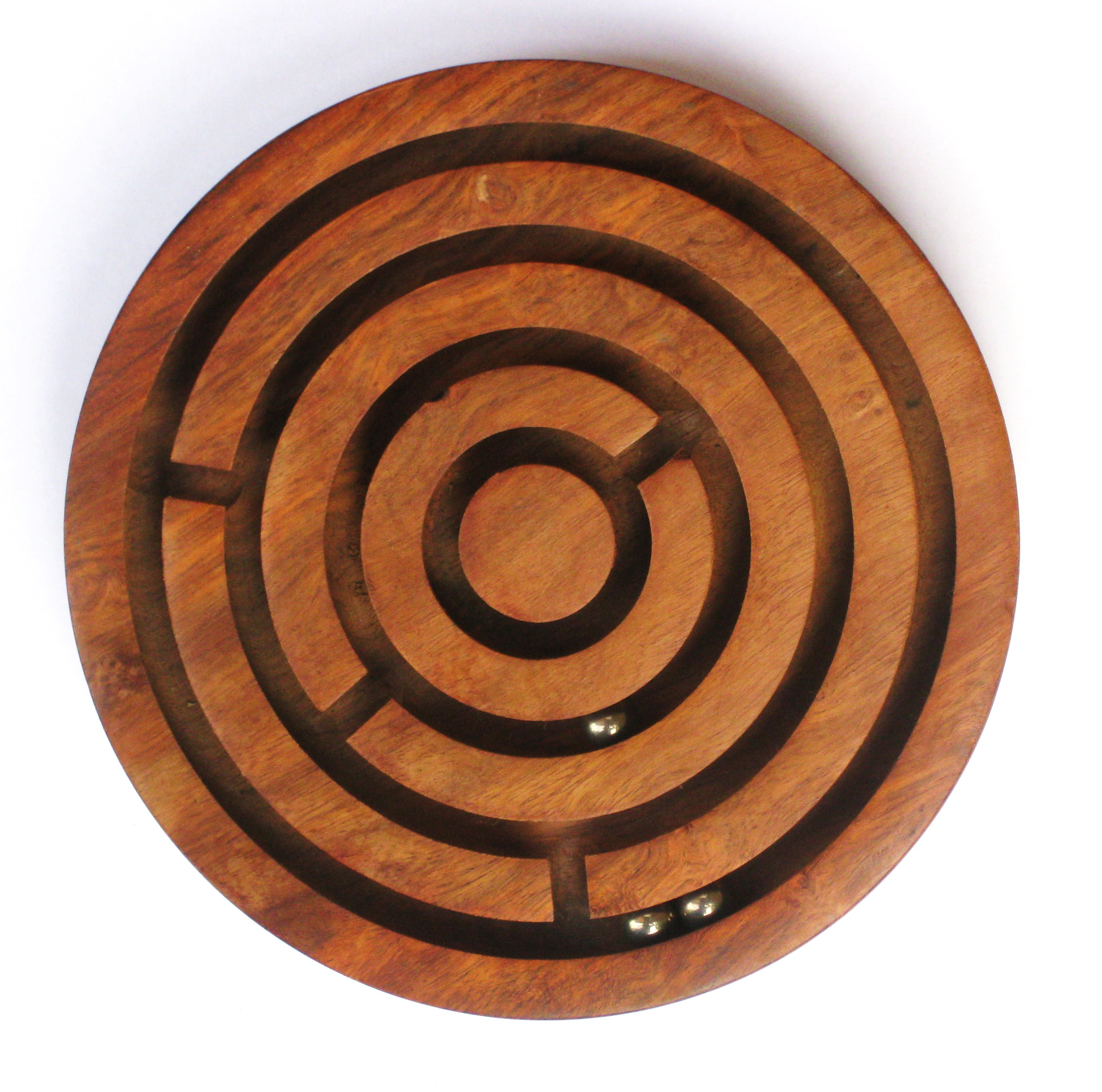
A simple wooden ball-in-a-maze

Ball-in-a-maze puzzles are dexterity puzzles which involve manipulating either a maze (or labyrinth) or one or several balls so that the ball or balls are maneuvered towards a goal. Toys like this have been popular since Pigs in Clover (also spelled Pigs-in-clover) was invented by Charles Martin Crandall and then patented on September 10, 1889. The game was a craze in the United States from mid-February to May 1889, with 8,000 puzzles being produced daily, according to The Waverly Free Press. It was played at home, on buses, in the street, parks, and even by US politicians. Sam Loyd falsely claimed to have invented it in an interview in 1891.

In some versions, a wooden labyrinth is tilted using two knobs and the ball has to be navigated past a series of holes and obstacles. A magnet is used in other versions where the balls have to be manipulated rather than the maze.

Another version, usually molded in transparent plastic, uses the ball as a key to opening an internal compartment by manipulating the ball into position, and then operating a sliding mechanism that releases an access door. They are sometimes called "Money Maze" banks or puzzle boxes.

Virtual versions of the puzzles have been made. They are often found in games for smartphones by making use of the phone's accelerometer. A game called Labyrinth was released in 2007 for jailbroken iPhones before the official App Store existed, eventually being made officially available once the App Store was launched.

== See also ==
- Labyrinth (marble game)
- Perplexus
- Rubik's 360
- List of Game of the Year awards
