= Ella Phillips Crandall =

American public health nurse

Ella P. Crandall
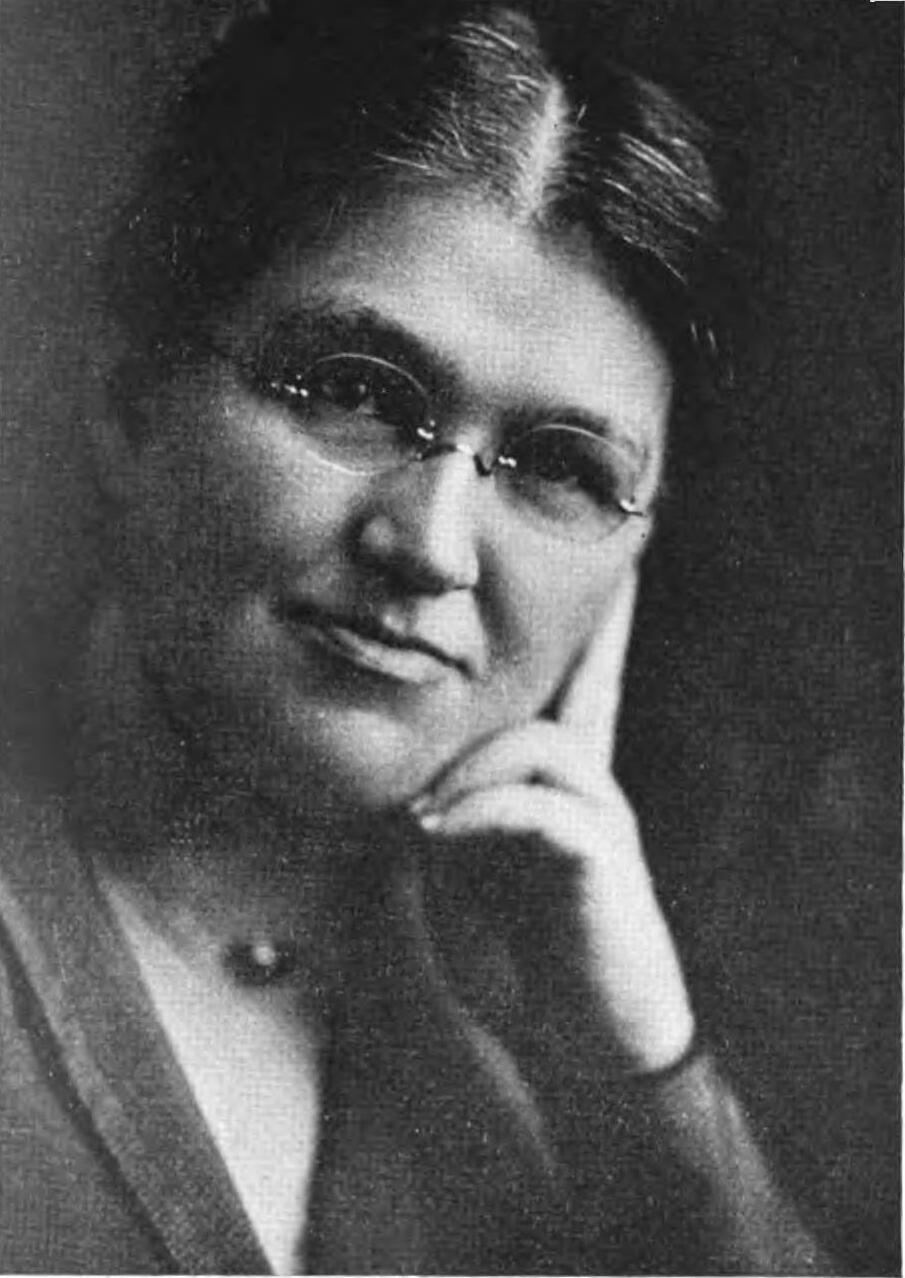
- Born: September 16, 1871; Wellsville, New York, U.S.
- Died: October 24, 1938 (aged 67); New York City, New York, U.S.
- Education: New York School of Philanthropy; Philadelphia General Hospital School of Nursing
- Occupation: Public health nurse
- Years active: 1899–1938
- Medical career
- Field: Public health nursing
- Institutions: National Organization for Public Health Nursing; Teachers College, Columbia University; Henry Street Settlement; Payne Fund

Ella Phillips Crandall (1871–1938) was an American nurse and a pioneer in public health nursing. She was the executive secretary of the National Organization for Public Health Nursing from 1912 to 1920. She served on the board of directors of the American Nurses Association and was on the faculty of Teachers College, Columbia University.

== Early life and education ==
Ella was born on September 16, 1871, in Wellsville, New York, to Alice (née Phillips) and Herbert A. Crandall. She was a descendant of the English Baptist minister John Crandall. Her family moved to Dayton, Ohio, in 1872 and she attended public schools there, graduating from high school in 1890. She earned a degree from the Philadelphia General Hospital School of Nursing in 1897, following a two-year course.

== Nursing career ==
Following her graduation, Crandall returned to Dayton in 1899. She worked as assistant superintendent of the Miami Valley Hospital and became the first director of the hospital's newly formed nursing school. Alongside superintendent S. Lillian Clayton, she transformed the school into a modern hospital and teaching institution. Her efforts led to her being described as having a "brilliant mind, indomitable character, and natural dignity." From 1908 to 1909 she was on the Society of Superintendents of Training Schools for Nurses' executive council.

In 1909, Crandall moved to New York City. She attended the New York School of Philanthropy and was a supervisor at Lillian Wald's Henry Street Settlement House, working a year in its visiting nurse service. From 1910 to 1912, she worked for the Teachers College of Columbia University on the graduate nursing faculty under Mary Adelaide Nutting. Crandall developed courses for health protection and district nursing.

In 1911, she served on a special commission of the American Nurses Association and the Society of Superintendents of Training Schools for Nurses to research the utility of public health initiatives to address issues in the slums of cities and rural areas, including disease and poverty. In 1912, the National Organization for Public Health Nursing was formed due to the work of the commission. Its objective was to improve nursing education and establish professional standards for public health nursing. Crandall was hired as executive secretary of the organization and worked there until 1920. She traveled widely in the United States, making contact with nurses working in the field. In a single year, she gave 83 public speeches and traveled over 82,000 miles. She oversaw a staff that grew to 20 people, contributed to the organization's Public Health Nurse (later Public Health Nursing) publication, and worked as an advocate for public health nursing.

During World War I, Crandall worked for the nursing committee of the American Red Cross from 1916 to 1918 and for the Council of National Defense's General Medical Board as the National Emergency Committee on Nursing's executive secretary. She also served on the board of directors of the American Nurses Association from 1913 to 1916 and from 1918 to 1920. After leaving the National Organization for Public Health Nursing, she was associate director of the American Child Health Association from 1922 to 1925. Through her work, Crandall knew philanthropist Frances Payne Bolton. When Bolton established the Payne Fund in 1927, she named Crandall as executive secretary. She worked there for the remainder of her life.

Crandall contracted pneumonia and died on October 24, 1938, at Roosevelt Hospital in New York City.

== Publication ==
- Crandall, Miss Ella Phillips (July 1915). "Scope of the Nurse in Public Health Work". American Journal of Public Health. 5 (7): 626–630. doi:10.2105/AJPH.5.7.626. PMC 1286641. PMID 18009265.
