= Viewpoints: Mathematical Perspective and Fractal Geometry in Art =

2011 book by Frantz and Crannell

- Author: Marc Frantz, Annalisa Crannell
- Publisher: Princeton University Press
- Publication date: 2011
- ISBN: 9780691125923

Viewpoints: Mathematical Perspective and Fractal Geometry in Art is a textbook on mathematics and art. It was written by mathematicians Marc Frantz and Annalisa Crannell, and published in 2011 by the Princeton University Press (ISBN 9780691125923). The Basic Library List Committee of the Mathematical Association of America has recommended it for inclusion in undergraduate mathematics libraries.

== Topics ==
The first seven chapters of the book concern perspectivity, while its final two concern fractals and their geometry. Topics covered within the chapters on perspectivity include coordinate systems for the plane and for Euclidean space, similarity, angles, and orthocenters, one-point and multi-point perspective, and anamorphic art. In the fractal chapters, the topics include self-similarity, exponentiation, and logarithms, and fractal dimension. Beyond this mathematical material, the book also describes methods for artists to depict scenes in perspective, and for viewers of art to understand the perspectives in the artworks they see, for instance by finding the optimal point from which to view an artwork. The chapters are ordered by difficulty, and begin with experiments that the students can perform on their own to motivate the material in each chapter.

The book is heavily illustrated by artworks and photography (such as the landscapes of Ansel Adams) and includes a series of essays or interviews by contemporary artists on the mathematical content of their artworks. An appendix contains suggestions aimed at teachers of this material.

== Audience and reception ==
Viewpoints is intended as a textbook for mathematics classes aimed at undergraduate liberal arts students, as a way to show these students how geometry can be used in their everyday life. However, it could even be used for high school art students, and reviewer Paul Kelley writes that "it will be of value to anyone interested in an elementary introduction to the mathematics and practice of perspective drawing". It differs from many other liberal arts mathematics textbooks in its relatively narrow focus on geometry and perspective, and its avoidance of more well-covered ground in mathematics and the arts such as symmetry and the geometry of polyhedra.

Although reviewer Blake Mellor complains that the connection between the material on perspective and on fractal geometry "feels forced", he concludes that "this is an excellent text". Reviewer Paul Kelley writes that the book's "step-by-step progression" through its topics makes it "readable [and] easy-to-follow", and that "Students can learn a great deal from this book." Reviewer Alexander Bogomolny calls it "an elegant fusion of mathematical ideas and practical aspects of fine art".
