= Fumiko Futamura =

Japanese-American mathematician

Fumiko Futamura is a Japanese-American mathematician known for her work on the mathematics of perspective and perspective drawing. She is a professor of mathematics at Southwestern University in Georgetown, Texas, and Lord Chair in Mathematics and Computer Science at Southwestern.

== Education and career ==
Futamura is originally from Japan, and emigrated with her family to Kentucky when she was five years old. She grew up in an artistic family, and despite a talent for mathematics preferred creating art in various mediums. She entered the University of Louisville intending to study art there, but switched to mathematics after taking linear algebra in her sophomore year, discovering the beauty in mathematical proofs, and becoming convinced by faculty mentor Steven Seif that mathematics could be viewed as a form of art.

She met her future husband, YouTube mathematics tutor Patrick Jones, when they were both mathematics students at the University of Louisville. After Futamura graduated summa cum laude in 2002, with a senior thesis on graphical methods in geometry supervised by Robert Powers, she and Jones both entered graduate study at Vanderbilt University. Jones dropped out of the graduate program to become a full-time mathematics tutor, but Futamura continued, earning a master's degree and completing her Ph.D. in 2007. Her dissertation, Symmetrically Localized Frames, Localized Operators and Their Application to the Construction of Localized Hilbert and Banach Frames, was supervised by Akram Aldroubi, and involved the theory of frames in linear algebra.

In order to continue her work combining mathematics with the creative arts, Futamura decided to teach mathematics at a liberal arts college rather than go into industry or take a research university position. She joined the Southwestern University faculty as an assistant professor in 2007, was tenured as an associate professor in 2013, and became a full professor in 2018. In the same year she became department chair.

== Writing and recognition ==
Futamura won the Carl B. Allendoerfer Award of the Mathematical Association of America in 2018, with Southwestern student Robert Lehr, for their 2017 article "A New Perspective on Finding the Viewpoint".

She is the coauthor of the book Perspective and Projective Geometry, with Annalisa Crannell and Marc Frantz, published by Princeton University Press in 2019.
