= Robert Hofstadter =

American physicist (1915–1990)

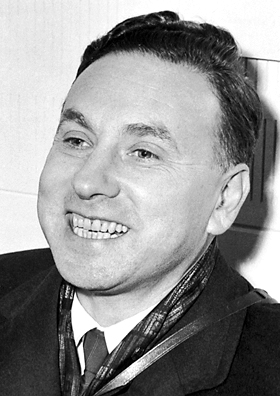
- Robert Hofstadter (1961, Nobel Foundation photo)
- Born: February 5, 1915; New York City, New York, U.S.
- Died: November 17, 1990 (aged 75); Stanford, California, U.S.
- Education: City College of New York (BS); Princeton University (MS, PhD)
- Occupations: Nuclear Physicist, Astrophysicist, University Professor
- Known for: Electron scattering Atomic nuclei Sodium iodide scintillator
- Spouse: Nancy (Givan) Hofstadter (1920–2007) (3 children including Douglas Hofstadter)
- Awards: Nobel Prize in Physics (1961); National Medal of Science (1986); Dirac Medal (UNSW) (1987)
- Scientific career
- Fields: Physics
- Workplaces: Stanford University; University of Pennsylvania
- Doctoral students: Carol Jo Crannell

Robert Hofstadter (February 5, 1915 – November 17, 1990) was an American physicist. He was the joint winner of the 1961 Nobel Prize in Physics (together with Rudolf Mössbauer) "for his pioneering studies of electron scattering in atomic nuclei and for his consequent discoveries concerning the structure of nucleons".

== Biography ==
Hofstadter was born in New York City on February 5, 1915, to Polish Jewish immigrants Louis Hofstadter, a salesman, and Henrietta, née Koenigsberg. He attended elementary and high schools in New York City and entered City College of New York, graduating with a B.S. degree magna cum laude in 1935 at the age of 20, and was awarded the Kenyon Prize in Mathematics and Physics. He also received a Charles A. Coffin Foundation Fellowship from the General Electric Company, which enabled him to attend graduate school at Princeton University, where he earned his M.S. and Ph.D. degrees at the age of 23. His doctoral dissertation was titled "Infra-red absorption by light and heavy formic and acetic acids." He did his post-doctoral research at the University of Pennsylvania and was an assistant professor at Princeton before joining Stanford University. Hofstadter taught at Stanford from 1950 to 1985.

In 1942 he married Nancy Givan (1920–2007), a native of Baltimore. They had three children: Laura, Molly, and Pulitzer Prize-winner Douglas Hofstadter.

== Opus ==
=== Thallium-activated sodium iodide gamma ray detector ===
In 1948 Hofstadter filed a patent on this for the detection of ionizing radiation by this crystal. These thallium-activated sodium iodide detectors are widely used for gamma ray detection to this day.

=== Coining of the fermi (unit) and 1961 Nobel Lecture ===
Robert Hofstadter coined the term fermi, symbol fm, in honor of the Italian physicist Enrico Fermi (1901–1954), one of the founders of nuclear physics, in Hofstadter's 1956 paper published in the Reviews of Modern Physics journal, "Electron Scattering and Nuclear Structure". The term is widely used by nuclear and particle physicists. When Hofstadter was awarded the 1961 Nobel Prize in Physics, it subsequently appeared in the text of his 1961 Nobel Lecture, "The electron-scattering method and its application to the structure of nuclei and nucleons" (December 11, 1961).

=== Compton Gamma Ray Observatory and EGRET Telescope ===
In his last few years, Hofstadter became interested in astrophysics and applied his knowledge of scintillators to the design of the EGRET gamma-ray telescope of the Compton Gamma Ray Observatory named for fellow Nobel Laureate in Physics (1927), Arthur Holly Compton. Stanford University's Department of Physics credits Hofstadter with being "one of the principal scientists who developed the Compton Observatory."

== Awards and honors ==
- 1958, elected to National Academy of Sciences.
- 1961 Nobel Prize in Physics, joint winner with Rudolf Mössbauer, "for his [Hofstadter's] pioneering studies of electron scattering in atomic nuclei and for his consequent discoveries concerning the structure of nucleons."
- Stanford University has an annual lecture series named after Hofstadter, the Robert Hofstadter Memorial Lectures, which consists of two lectures each year, one oriented toward the general public and the other oriented toward scientists.
- 1970, elected to the American Academy of Arts and Sciences.
- 1984 Golden Plate Award of the American Academy of Achievement.
- 1986, elected to the American Philosophical Society.

== See also ==
- Fermi (unit)
- The Big Bang Theory popular TV sitcom supposedly named one of its main characters, Leonard Hofstadter, after Hofstadter.
- List of Jewish Nobel laureates

== Publication list ==
Technical reports:

- Hofstadter, R. "Detection of Neutrons with Scintillation Counters", Brookhaven National Laboratory, United States Department of Energy (through predecessor agency the Atomic Energy Commission), (November 1948).
- Hahn, B., Ravenhall, D. G. and R. Hofstadter. "High-energy Electron Scattering and the Charge Distributions of Selected Nuclei," Stanford University, United States Department of Energy (through predecessor agency the Atomic Energy Commission), Office of Naval Research and United States Air Force, (October 1955).
- Chambers, E.E. and R. Hofstadter. "The Structure of the Proton", Stanford University, United States Department of Energy (through predecessor agency the Energy Research and Development Administration), Office of Naval Research and United States Air Force (April 1956).
- Hofstadter, R. "Structure in the Proton and the Neutron", Stanford University, United States Department of Energy (through predecessor agency the Atomic Energy Commission), (June 1958).
- Collard, H., Hofstadter, R., Hughes, E. B., Johansson, A., Yearian, M. R., Day, R. B. and R. T. Wagner. "Elastic Electron Scattering from Tritium and Helium-3", Stanford University, United States Department of Energy (through predecessor agency the Atomic Energy Commission), Los Alamos Scientific Laboratory, Office of Naval Research, Air Force Research Laboratory, (October 1964).
- Hofstadter, R. "K-edge Subtraction Angiography with Synchrotron X-Rays: Final Technical Report, (February 1, 1984 to January 31, 1987)", Stanford University, United States Department of Energy, (September 1987).
