= Carol Jo Crannell =

American solar physicist

Carol Jo Crannell (November 15, 1938 – May 10, 2009) was a solar physicist known for her work on solar flares and on the astrophysical observation of x-rays and gamma rays. She worked for thirty years at the NASA Goddard Space Flight Center.

== Life ==
Crannell was born in Columbus, Ohio. She graduated from Miami University in 1960, and completed her Ph.D. in physics at Stanford University in 1967, with Robert Hofstadter as her doctoral advisor. She worked at the Goddard Space Flight Center from 1974 until 2004, when she retired.

Crannell also held an adjunct faculty position at Catholic University of America, where her husband, Hall L. Crannell, is an emeritus professor. Her daughter, Annalisa Crannell, is a mathematician at Franklin & Marshall College.

== Research ==
Crannell's doctoral research concerned particle showers. At Goddard, Crannell pushed for x-ray and gamma-ray observations of the sun, and led balloon-mounted experiments to make these observations.

== Activism ==
Crannell played an active role in the struggle for equal opportunity for women in physics. She chaired the Committee on the Status of Women in Physics of the American Physical Society, and helped found the CSWP Gazette, the newsletter of the Committee. Through her position at the Catholic University she also helped bring underrepresented students to summer internships at Goddard.

== Recognition ==
Crannell became a Fellow of the American Physical Society in 1992, and a Fellow of the American Association for the Advancement of Science in 1998. In 1990, Women in Aerospace gave her their Outstanding Achievement Award "for her dedication to expanding women’s opportunities for career advancement and for increasing their visibility through her activities as an aerospace professional".
