= Bop It =

Handheld audio game

- A logo used since 2008

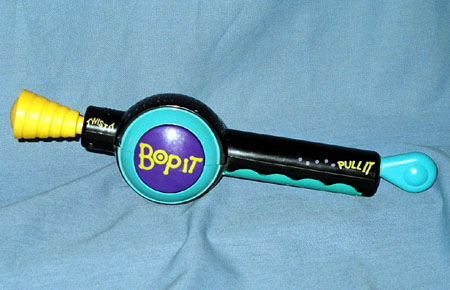
- The original Bop It
- Manufacturers: Hasbro
- Designers: Dan Klitsner
- Voice actors: Varies depending on model and language
- Publication: 1996; 30 years ago
- Languages: English, French, German, Italian, Latin American Spanish, European Spanish, Danish, Portuguese, and Japanese
- Players: 1+
- Chance: Medium (command order)
- Age range: 8+
- Skills: Reaction time; Coordination

Bop It, stylized as bop it! since 2008, is a line of audio game toys. By following a series of commands issued through voice recordings produced by a speaker by the toy, which has multiple inputs including pressable buttons, pull handles, twisting cranks, spinnable wheels, flickable switches, the player progresses and the pace of the game increases.

Based on concepts originally patented by Dan Klitsner Bop It was licensed to Hasbro and further developed there by a number of designers including Bob Welch. Welch designed and provided the voice for the original Bop It, which released in 1996. With newer versions, additional inputs have been added or altered such that units like the 2010 Bop-It! Bounce shares no inputs in common with the original Bop It.

Bop It has been identified as some of the more popular children's games on the market, and toy and game development researchers have pointed to the natural interactions between player and toy, and the ability of players to use the toy to revert computer gaming processes back into those that resemble non-mediated object play. Other studies have shown that it is the Bop It's ability to mimic engagement in social behavior that has led to its commercial successes. Bop It has been released in many foreign languages since its re-release in 2008. With all models by KID Group, the team have managed to find voice actors to record the voice for the most popular languages in the world such as French, German, Italian, Latin American Spanish, European Spanish, Danish, Portuguese, and Japanese.

Since 2008, the voice of Bop It has been Buddy Rubino. Rubino has voiced all the modern Bop It games which include: Bop It!, Bop It! XT, Bop It! Smash, Bop It! Tetris, Bop It! Micro (original recordings from Bop It!), Bop It! New Moves and Bop It! Maker. Rubino was unaware of Bop It when recording the voice, and was advised to do it "really excited". Bop It has sold over 30 million units worldwide.

== Original series (1996–2006) ==
=== Bop It ===
In 1996, a handheld voice game called Bop It was designed and developed by a team including American inventors Dan Kiltsner and Bob Welch, who also provided the voice for the device. This game was the first of what was later to become a series of Bop It games relying on the same set of basic patents. The original game, called simply Bop It, features three inputs — "Bop it!" (a depressible button), "Twist it!" (a twistable knob) and "Pull it!" (a pullable handle) — and three game modes: Solo Bop, Vox Bop and Beat Bop. Gameplay is predicated upon a player's efforts to match the commands issued by the unit in a timely manner by performing the task that is commanded, so if the unit is to call out "Bop it!", the player must quickly depress the "Bop It!" button. If it is to call out "Twist it!", the player must quickly turn the "Twist it!" knob. If it is to call out "Pull it!", the player must quickly pull the "Pull It!" handle. Players' scores are announced at the end of gameplay with a cypher in which different tones represent different point values and the maximum possible score is 100. In 2000, a second edition model was made which can score up to 200. In the 2000 release at the end sequence, each "Pull It!" whistle denotes 100 points, each ratchet denotes 10, and each drum denotes 1 point. If the player reaches 200 points, the game will just play the victory song. This style of score-reporting would later recur in later Bop It models, and the Zing It spin off (see below). The same cypher values were used for all subsequent Bop It cyphers. This device requires three AA batteries. The toy won the BATR Electronic Game of the Year award in 2003 and 2005.

=== Bop It Extreme ===
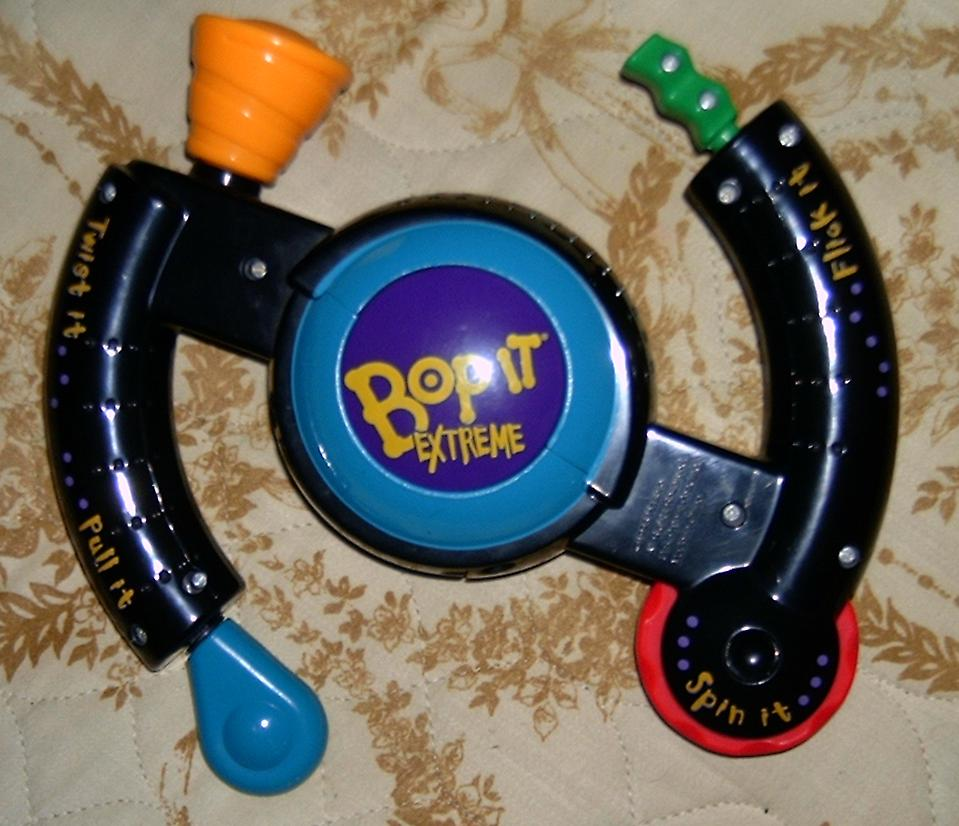
The Bop It Extreme

In 1998, Hasbro copyrighted its instructions for the Bop It Extreme, describing the underlying patents as "pending." This game included the additional commands "Flick it!" (a green zigzag lever) and "Spin it!" (a red wheel) along with the original three from Bop It. The game featured four game modes (Vox Bop, Beat Bop, Vox Bop Solo and Beat Bop Solo), and the maximum score (reported via cypher) was increased to 250. As with the earlier Bop It model, special victory songs were unlocked upon completion. Thus, achieving a score of 100 or greater rewards the player with an additional victory song after the announcement of the score. On reaching 150 inputs, a different special victory celebration plays, and achievement of the maximum score would trigger a yet different special victory ending. This device requires three AA batteries.

In 2003, this model was one of the top games in the market.

=== Bop It Extreme 2 ===
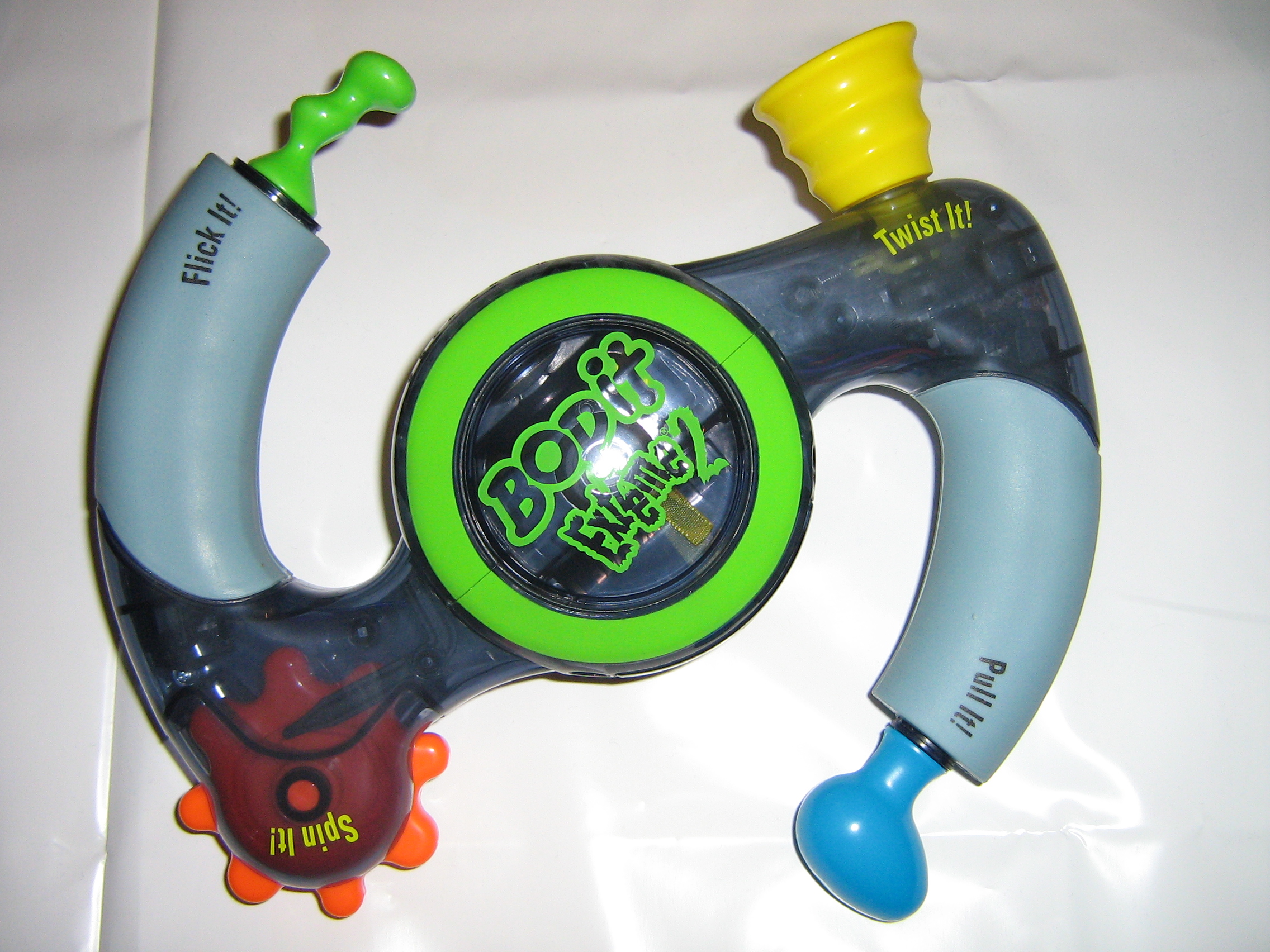
The Bop It Extreme 2

Partially reliant on the original Bop It's 2000 patent, the Bop It Extreme 2 also relied on the newly issued 2001 patent describing the layout changes that had been adopted for use in the Bop It Extreme. With its instructions copyrighted in 2002, the layout of Hasbro's Bop It Extreme 2 was shown to be altered from that of Bop It Extreme. The shapes of several inputs were also altered. Volume controls were added, and the method of score reporting was changed to using plain English. In addition to the four modes featured in Bop It Extreme, a "One on One" mode was added. Bop It Extreme 2 was awarded "Electronic Game of the Year 2005" in the UK. This device requires three AA batteries.

Bop It Extreme 2 was made in black, white, and pink variants. The Bop it Extreme 2 like the Bop it Extreme has a maximum score of 250. Hasbro also released a German-speaking version with the name "Simon Challenge".

=== Bratz Bop It ===
As described in its instruction manual (copyright 2004), Hasbro's Bratz-themed Bop It game uses a layout like that of the earlier (three-input) Bop It format. The maximum score in Bratz Bop It had the same scoring as the original Bop It re-release with a victory song playing after the score cypher for scores of over 100 points. Bratz Bop It requires three AAA batteries to operate.

=== Bop It Blast ===
In 2005, Hasbro copyrighted the instructions to Bop It Blast, describing it as covered under the original (three-input) Bop It patent and referencing other patents that were pending. The game was also developed by Tiger Electronics. This member of the series again increased the maximum score to a total of 500, and for the first time allowed different high scores for different modes rather than having one high score for all modes collectively. Minor vocal additions were implemented such as the announcement of the player's score at notable landmarks (each 100 points scored). In addition to the six modes from Bop It Extreme 2, a "Light Bop" mode was added. The game also had an optional female voice. The game can allow the player to select a male, female, or both voices calling the commands. The same victory song from the original Bop It was used to report the 500 highest score. The sound effects and backing beats from this version were used for the current release of Bop It's. This device requires three AA batteries to operate.

=== Bop It Download ===
In 2006, Hasbro copyrighted the instructions to Bop It Download, describing it as covered under the five-input Bop It patent and referencing other patents that are pending. Tiger Electronics also developed the game. This member of the Bop It line has three game modes: Solo, Pass It and One-on-One and has 15 levels of difficulty. The maximum score is 1000 and this Bop It lets the player download a program on a Windows computer to download new content. The software was discontinued a few years later when Bop It Download was discontinued by Hasbro. The 'level up' sound was taken from this Bop It to be re-used in newer Bop It models such as the Bop It! and the Bop It! XT.

== Current versions (2008-) ==
=== Bop It! ===
In 2008, Hasbro secured the copyrights to the instructions for Bop It!. At the 2009 New York Toy Fair and at the London Toy Fair, Hasbro allowed attendees to try out Bop It!. Bop It! has a new optional input "Shout It", which requires a player to shout into the microphone. The Bop It! has three difficulty levels: "Novice", using only voice commands, "Expert", using a random mix of voice and sound commands, and "Master", calling out voice, sound, and color commands. If the player scores 100 points in either of the less difficult modes, the next most difficult mode is unlocked. Players that achieve a score of 100 points in "Master" mode are considered to have beaten the game. Hasbro also added a multi-player game called "Party" where all the Bop It commands are replaced with body parts like "foot", "hip", and "arm". Bop It! requires three AAA batteries to operate and when the game turns off it will say "I'm going to sleep". All future Bop Its made by KID Group feature this sound.

=== Bop-It! Bounce ===
After securing the copyrights to the instructions in 2009, Hasbro made announcements regarding the newest member of the Bop It game line, entitled Bop-It! Bounce during the 2010 Hasbro Toy Fair. The toy was also developed by Big Monster Toys. This toy features a ball and a small hand-held trampoline. There are six games that may be played on Bop It! Bounce including three games that emphasize the speed or number of bounces and three games that emphasize the player's ability to control the height of the bounces.

- Max Bounce – Players compete to achieve the greatest number of bounces in 30 seconds.
- Infinite Bounce – Players compete to achieve the greatest number of bounces without a time limit.
- Hang Time – Players compete to bounce the ball the highest.
- Right Height – The player must listen to vocal cues from the Bop It! Bounce, calling for higher or lower bounces until the correct height is achieved when a chime sounds.
- Little-Middle-Big – As with Right Height, the player must listen to vocal cues from the Bop It! Bounce calling for bounces of "big" height, "middle" height, or "little" height.
- Free Form – The toy produces different tones as the ball bounces to different heights.

=== Bop It! XT ===
In 2010, the instructions for the Bop It! XT were copyrighted. The Bop It! XT is the fourth edition of Bop It Extreme with the same commands but adding a new command, "Shake It". Another change is that "Spin It" is now orange. The game was demonstrated at the London Toy Fair and was released in 2011. The Bop It! XT is based on the gameplay of the Bop It! and returns the "One on One" mode and adds the new Pro level. In order to beat Bop-It! XT, the player is given a set of three commands to remember and must perform them in order with a mix of voice, sound and color commands 100 times.

=== Bop-It! Smash ===
In 2012, Hasbro introduced Bop-It! Smash at the New York Toy Fair. Bop-It! Smash features color-changing lights in a central area called "The Zone". Players score by "smashing" two Bop-It! buttons together when a zone light is either green or blue. Bop-It! Smash has three various game modes: Solo, Pass It and Multi-player.

In Solo mode, the player scores five points for smashing a blue light and one point for smashing the green. If the player smashes the amber light, the voice will say "Yow!" (followed by a negative comment such as: "Try harder!") and a game life will be deducted. After four rounds, the level is completed and a Bonus Round will begin. The player can get 5 or more bonus points. The highest number of bonus points a player can score in the bonus round is 105 and the player can break the programming and score over 1000 with the voice not being able to announce the score at the end of the game. After the level 5 bonus round, the bonus round becomes twice as fast from levels 6 to 10 making the game harder to score points. During a level (except bonus rounds) the player can earn a life back if they smash another blue light after smashing an amber. In the Pass It mode, the player has three attempts to try and smash a green or a blue. If they smash an orange light three times, then the game is over. In the multi-player mode, up to six players can play. The winner is the last one surviving after all other players have lost all their lives.

=== Bop It! Tetris ===
In early 2013, the Tetris Company signed a deal with Hasbro to make Tetris-themed games with their brands. Later in 2013, Hasbro launched Jenga and Bop It-themed versions of Tetris. It features a "Marathon" mode and additional modes based around different gameplay styles (Blast, Double Drop and Shuffle). A special Silver edition was also released in late 2013 only in the United States. In the Marathon mode, the player can take advantage of the bonus rounds to score over 800 points.

=== Bop It! Beats ===
In 2013, Hasbro released a game called Bop It! Beats which first appeared on Amazon in December 2013. Bop It! Beats has five game modes: Classic, Classic Party, DJ, DJ Party and Remix and has three difficulty levels: Rookie, Expert and Lights Only. It also has five actions: Bop It, Spin It, Scratch It, Reverse, Repeat and Flip It. In the Classic mode, there are four rounds and each of the two has a different set of songs that the game switches between. In the second and fourth round, there are two songs that Hasbro chose to use in the game. The highest score in Classic is 263 and the highest score in the DJ mode is 147 if played in the Expert level in the DJ Party mode. The game also has a Remix mode on which you can play any action sound effect you want on the turntable of the game. This particular Bop It has a glitch on which if the player reaches a six-command pattern in the DJ Expert and Lights Only mode, the game will make the player fail. However, this glitch does not happen in a foreign-language version like the Spanish or the French versions.

=== Bop It! Micro Series ===
The Bop It! Micro Series is a version of Bop It released in 2014 by Hasbro. It uses the three basic commands Bop It, Twist It and Pull It and it has two game modes: Solo and Pass It. The game also has three volume levels. The highest score in the Bop It! Micro is 100 and as the player scores closer to 100 the pitch of the gameplay will speed up. As Hasbro released it as a series of games, several character-themed versions of the Micro Bop It followed which include Bop It R2D2, Bop It BB8, Bop It Groot and Bop It Minion. In addition to these characters, Hasbro have released a Bop It Olaf and a Bop It Chewbacca in 2019. On June 23, 2020, Hasbro announced a new Bop It Yoda (The Child) based on The Mandalorian TV show. It had a release date of October 2, 2020. It was a Wal-Mart exclusive. On October 1, 2021, the Marvel Spider-Man Bop It was released. On June 29, 2022, a video on YouTube by Lucky Penny Shop was released, along with an article from another sourced about a Bop It shaped like Darth Vader with the voice of Emperor Palpatine calling the commands. The game was released on September 23, 2022, as a Wal-Mart exclusive.

=== Bop It! New Moves (2016 Bop It – aka: Bop It! Refresh) ===
In 2015, Hasbro copyrighted the instructions to a new model of Bop It to be released in 2016 called Bop It! New Moves (aka Bop It Refresh or the Bop It 2016). In January 2016, a YouTube channel called KidToyTesters released a video of a working prototype of the game. In February 2016 at the New York Toy Fair, Hasbro demonstrated Bop It New Moves. The game was released worldwide in June 2016. The game has three main actions: Bop It, Twist It and Pull It, and ten actions that use a motion sensor. These actions include Whip It, Drink It, Selfie It, Comb It, Answer It, Saw It, Hammer It, Cradle It, Sing It and Golf It. The game has six modes: Action, Action Pass It, Classic, Classic Pass It, Beat Bop and Beat Bop Pass It. The Action mode has a maximum score of 200 points and the Classic and Beat Bop mode has a maximum score of 100 points. The game is the first and only Bop It to have a motion detector that detects when to change the batteries. It will remind the player with a sad pitch-changing voice saying "my batteries are running low" when the batteries need changing.

=== Bop It! Maker ===
In 2017, Hasbro released the follow-up to the Bop It! New Moves called Bop It! Maker. The game was first demonstrated at New York Toy Fair in 2017 and was released in July 2017. The Bop It! Maker has ten slots available on where the player can record their custom moves for the game. The game has four new actions: Bop It, Roll It, Shout It and Squeeze It. The game has three modes: Solo, Party and Basic. In the Solo mode, the game uses the four moves and all the recorded moves. In the Party mode, the game plays like Solo but instead the "Pass It" command is issued. In the Basic mode, the voice says "Bop It to Start!" and plays a little faster than the Solo mode. Each mode can score up to 100 points.

=== Bop It! Arcade ===
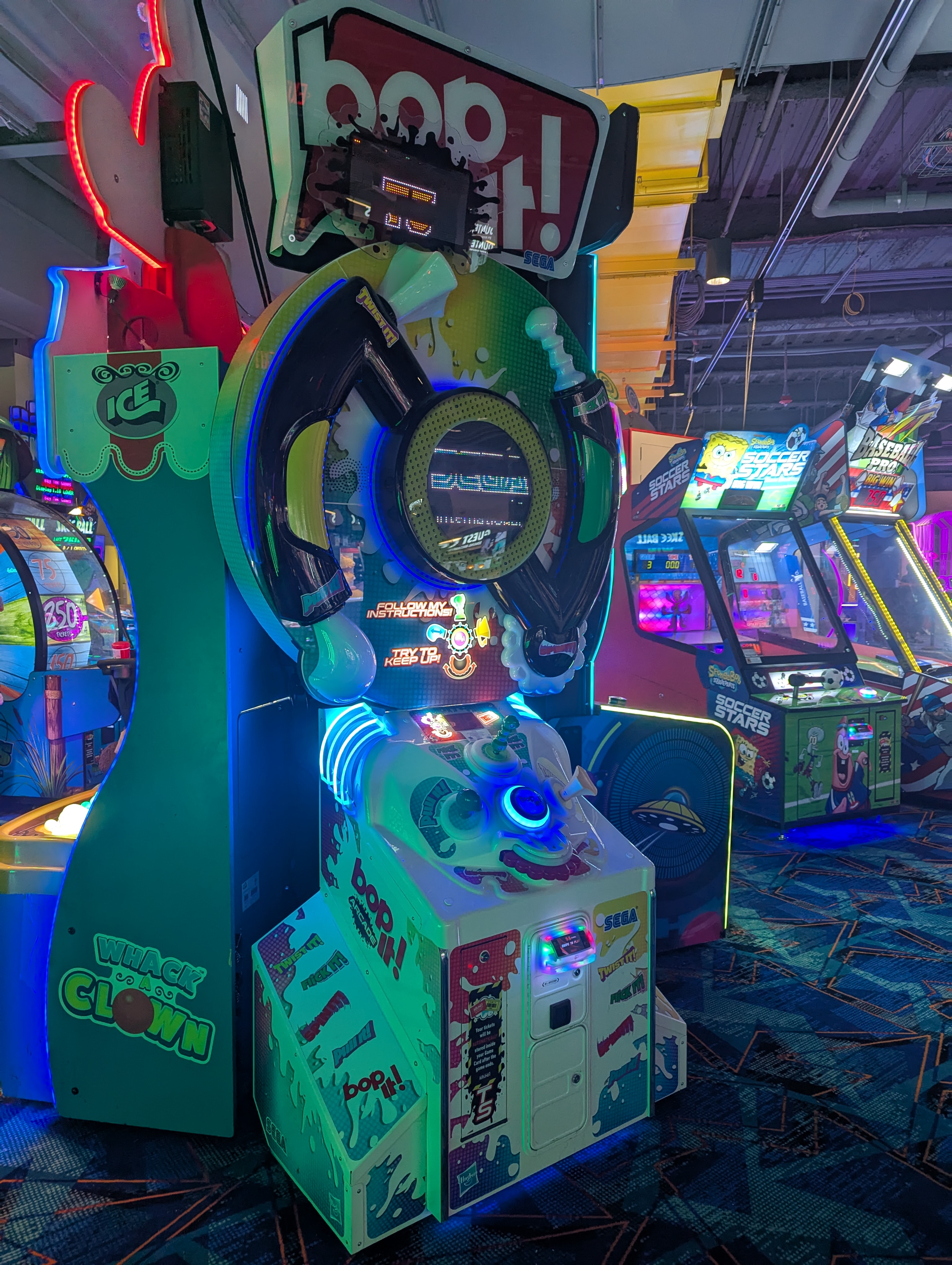
A Bop It! arcade game in Danbury, Connecticut

An arcade game based on Bop It! was presented at the 2022 IAAPA Expo in Orlando, Florida, developed by Sega Amusements International.

=== Re-release versions ===
==== Bop It re-release (2000) and (2002) ====
In July 2000, the first patent for Bop It was issued. This patent covers all subsequent Bop It models, and was cited in the instructions for the re-release of the original Bop It (instructions copyrighted in 2000). The newer version of the original toy increased its maximum score to 200. In addition to the score-report cypher, the 2000 model made use of a special victory song that would play after the score if the player achieved a score of 100 points or greater. The use of victory songs associated with in-game point-plateaus would recur in later model Bop It games such as Bop It Extreme and Bratz Bop It.

=== Bop It! Classic (Bop It Micro Re-release) ===
In 2019, Hasbro released a new version of Bop It called the Bop It Classic. The game was released in the US in July 2019 with a worldwide release expected in the Autumn of 2019. The game has four modes: Solo, Pass It, Beat Bop Solo and Beat Bop Pass It and has three actions: Bop It, Twist It and Pull It. The game's programming is based on the Bop It Micro but it game unit is bigger than the Micro and looks like a Bop It from 2009. The recording of "Beat Bop" was taken from the 2016 Bop It whilst all the other voices were from the Bop It! Micro Series. Each game mode has a maximum score of 100 points.

==== Keychain, pen and carabiner versions ====
Mini versions of several Bop It models have also been released throughout the duration of the series to be used as keychain carabiners and pens. Mini versions have been released for Bop It 1996 and 2002, Bop It Extreme, Bop It Extreme 2, Bop It!, and Bop It! XT.

== Game modes ==
=== Vox Bop (with voice commands) ===
"Vox Bop" is a multi-player game that serves as the primary game mode for the Bop It toy. A voice recording in the game machine calls out the commands randomly with a musical beat that increases in speed as the game progresses. The player must match the series of commands exactly and then the voice will call out "Pass It!" and the Bop It is passed to the next player. As the player passes the game to the next player, the game will play a short melody and then the intro beat will play again before the next command. A player is "out" of the game if the player performs the wrong action or if the player hesitates. This mode is also known as "Vox Bop Pass It" in Bop It Extreme 2, and then simply "Pass It" in Bop It Download, Bop It XT, Bop It! and later models.

==== Vox Bop One on One ====
"Vox Bop One on One" is available on Bop It Extreme 2, Bop It Blast, Bop It Download, and Bop It! XT, though in Download and XT it is simply "One on One". In this multi-player game, two players each take hold of the Bop It with the yellow player holding the "Twist It!" crank and the "Pull It!" knob, and the green player holding the "Flick It!" lever and the "Spin It!" wheel. The unit calls out a series of commands and each player is responsible for only his or her assigned inputs. When the unit finally calls "Bop It!" both players must try to hit the "Bop It!" button on the side bearing their color first. The unit will announce which player was faster by which colored side of the button was depressed first. The winning player earns a point. If either player misses a call she or he is "out" of the game. The final winner is the player who gets to five points first and does not miss any commands.

=== Beat Bop (with musical commands) ===
The "Beat Bop" mode follows a similar format as the "Vox Bop (with voice commands)" mode (above) and the rules are roughly equivalent. The game mode is called "Lights Only" in Bop It Beats. The difference in "Beat Bop" mode is that the game uses sounds as commands instead of words. Thus:

- "Bop It!" becomes the sound of a bass drum.
- "Spin It!" becomes the sound of a wobbling wheel.
- "Flick It!" becomes a "Boing!" sound.
- "Pull It!" becomes the sound of a slide-whistle.
- "Twist It!" becomes a cranking sound.
- "Shout It!" becomes a DJ's scratching sound.
- "Shake It!" becomes a cowbell sound.

=== Solo Bop ===
"Solo Bop" is the single-player mode for the original Bop It. This game is substantially similar to "Vox Bop (with voice commands)", except the "Pass It!" command is never issued. Instead, when the player misses a command, the game ends and the score is reported. This mode is also known as "Vox Bop Solo" in Bop It Extreme and Bop It Extreme 2, and simply "Solo" in "Bop It!", Bop It XT! and later models.

==== Beat Bop Solo ====
"Beat Bop Solo" is only available for Bop It Extreme, Bop It Extreme 2 and the Bop It 2019 model. This game is substantially similar to the "Beat Bop (with musical commands)" mode, except that the "Pass It!" command is never issued. Instead, when the player misses a command, the game ends and the score is reported.

=== Light Bop ===
The "Light Bop" mode is featured in Bop It Blast and Bop It Download. The player must respond when the light and the command match together.

=== Color Commands ===
In the Master level on Bop It! and Bop It! XT, color commands are issued. Color commands are also issued in the "Pro" mode on Bop It XT.

- "Bop It" becomes the word "White" in Bop It! and "Black" in Bop It! XT
- "Twist It" becomes the word "Yellow"
- "Pull It" becomes the word "Blue"
- "Shout It" becomes the word "Green" in Bop It!
- "Flick It" becomes the word "Green" in Bop It! XT
- "Spin It" becomes the word "Orange"
- "Shake It" becomes the word "Purple"

== Software versions ==
In 2009, EA Games released Hasbro Family Game Night 2, a sequel to the earlier-released collection of Hasbro boardgames and toys, Hasbro Family Game Night. Hasbro Family Game Night 2 was released for the Nintendo Wii and the Nintendo DS and both versions featured Bop It as a playable simulation.

In 2011, EA Games released an app for the iPod Touch, iPhone and iPad. This app features several game modes, commands from the handheld games, X-Move bonuses and newer commands like "Brush It!", "Crank It!", "Squeeze It!", and "Poke It!".

EA Games has also made Hasbro Family Game Night 4: The Game Show which features Bop It as a playable simulation.

Chillingo made a Bop It Smash app for iOS.

In 2025, Bop It! The Video Game was released for Windows, MacOS, Android, IOS, and the Nintendo Switch system. It released as free to download on mobile devices and cost 7.99 USD on other platforms.

== Sister products ==
The popularity of the Bop It line encouraged Hasbro to release a number of sister products.

=== Zing It ===
Zing It is a yo-yo-style audio game that, like Bop It, issues commands with which the player must comply. Like the original Bop It, three commands may be issued: "Bop it!", requiring the player to press the depress-able purple button, "Zing it!", requiring the player to throw the yo-yo downward and jerk it back up to the hand again, and "Loop it!", requiring the player to perform the "round the world" yo-yo trick. Zing It features three modes: "Vox Bop" (as with Bop It products), "Beat Bop" (as with Bop It products), and "Vox Bop Challenge", where the game will test mental pelmanism by issuing rapid strings of commands which must be subsequently performed in the correct order. As with Bop It and Bop It Extreme, Zing It announces the score by musical cypher. Like the two Bop It Extreme games, Zing It has a maximum score of 250 and is announced by a horn, followed by a crowd clapping.

=== Top It ===
With its instructions copyrighted in 1999, the Top It is a kendama-style audio game developed by Parker Bros. (under Hasbro) that also issues commands which a player must respond to with the appropriate action. Commands include "Top it!" (requiring the player to catch the ball in the red top cup), "Flop it!" (requiring the player to catch the ball in one of the purple side cups), and "Flip it!" (requiring the player to catch the ball in the purple side cup on the other side). The command structure has slightly fewer variations than any other Hasbro game, since the "Flip it!" command can only be issued if the "Flop it!" command directly precedes it.

=== Torx ===
The Torx is an audio game developed by Big Monster Toys under Hasbro that was released in 2000. The game has two twistable circles and two bendable arms that can bend in different angles 90 degrees. The game has four modes: Follow My Command, Find My Shape, Torx Says and Pass Torx. In Follow my Command, the game plays like a Bop It but the commands can get more complex. First the voice will say "Twist me" but then it can command the player to "Twist me again" or to "Twist me back". If it says "Bend me" it can command the player to "Bend me back", "Bend the same side" or "Bend the other side". Every 15 points, the game will announce "Torx Challenge" and give the player a sequence of commands to memorize. The challenge mode is similar to the one in Top It and Zing It and the player must start the sequence after Torx says "Ready, go!". In Find My Shape, the game unit will tell the player how close they are to the shape that Torx wants to be. It will give out directions like "Cooler", "Hotter" and when the player is near Torx will say "On fire!" and a sound effect will play if they find the shape. If the player is not near the correct shape, Torx will say "Ice cold!", "Warm" or "Warmer". In Torx Says, the game will produce 2 different tones. With a normal pitched Torx unit, if the player hears an F note, they must follow the command. If they hear a B flat note they must not follow the command. The game is over if the player beats the game or fails to respond or hesitate. In game four, the game will player like Game 1 but instead after a certain sequence of commands, the player will hear "Pass Torx". The maximum score in each game mode is 240.

=== Groove It ===
Groove It is an audio game made by Hasbro whose instructions have been copyrighted in 2003. With similar game play to the Bop It games, Groove It employs photodetection technology to determine the player's hand position. As with Bop It games, Groove It issues voice commands; however, in this case the commands are: "the scratch", "the slide", and "the zoom". The game is more tolerant of errors than the Bop It games, allowing as many as three missed commands in some modes. The game requires a score of 250 to win, has a maximum score of 300, and employs a ranking system. As the game progresses, it issues eight new moves: "the chop", "the zip", "the flow", "the car wash", "the rock 'n' roll", "the kung fu", "the swirl" and "the hip hop".
