= Todd Crandell =

American triathlete

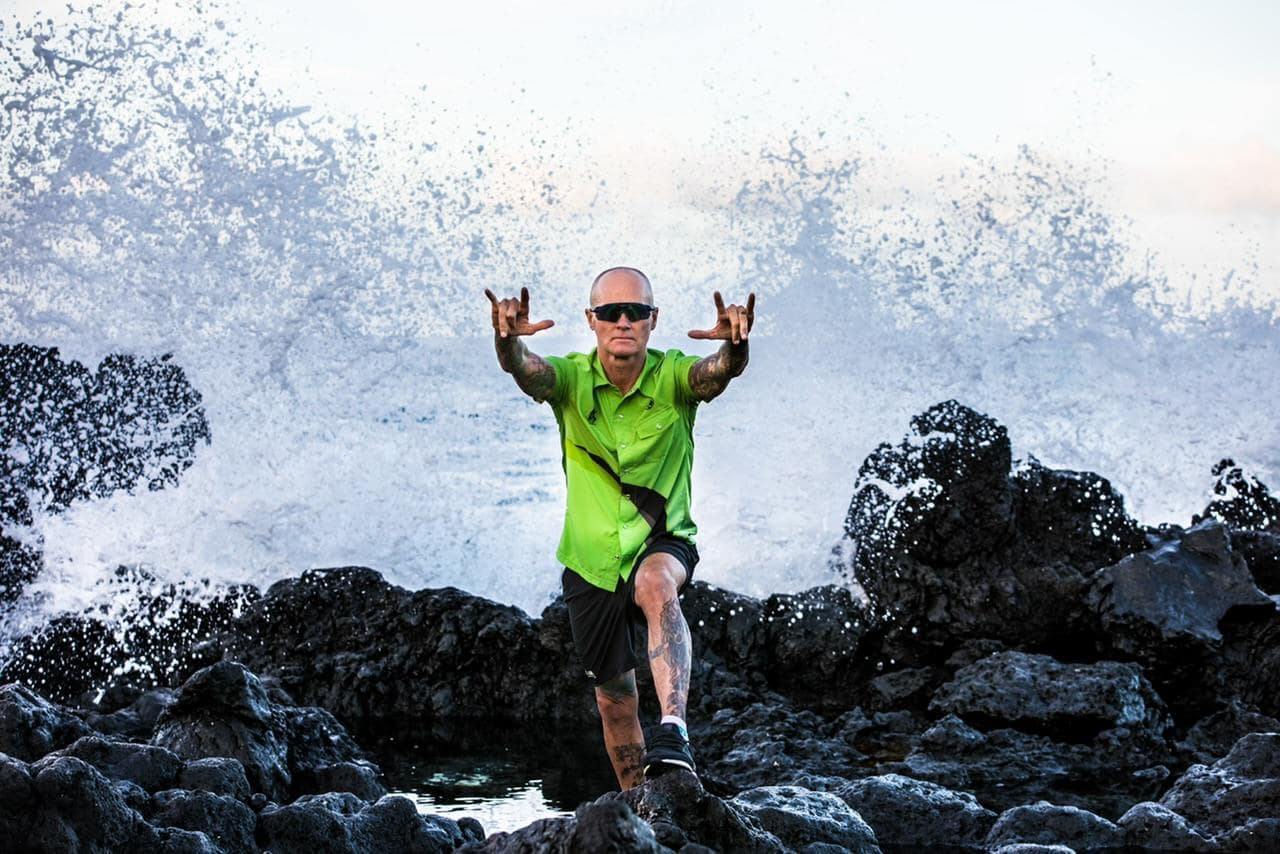
- Born: December 12, 1966 (age 59); Toledo, Ohio, U.S.
- Education: Lourdes University (bachelor's degree); Spring Arbor University (Master of Counseling)
- Occupation: Triathlete

Todd Crandell (born December 12, 1966) is an American triathlete. He is also a licensed professional clinical counselor and a chemical dependency counselor.

== Early life and education ==
Crandell was born in Toledo, Ohio. He was only three years old when his mother ended her life. He was expelled from high school for cocaine use, which ruined a promising hockey career. After over a decade of alcohol and drug addiction, he finally stopped using when he was arrested for his third driving under influence offense.

He completed his bachelor's degree from Lourdes University in Sylvania, Ohio, and his master of counseling from Spring Arbor University in Spring Arbor, Michigan.

== Career ==
Crandell completed his first Ironman in 1999. He underwent knee surgery two days after that race and was not expected to participate again in any race. Five months later, he finished his second Ironman. He has also competed in Ironman competitions worldwide on six continents.

Crandell has completed in 28 Ironmans, 42 half Ironmans, and two Ultramans. To date, he has completed close to 100 Ironman triathlons.

Crandell is also a licensed professional clinical counselor and a licensed independent chemical dependency counselor. He established Racing for Recovery in 2001.

He has written two books: Racing for Recovery: From Addict to Ironman in 2006, and, in collaboration with Lauren Kanne, Choices and Consequences.
