= Annalisa Crannell =

American mathematician

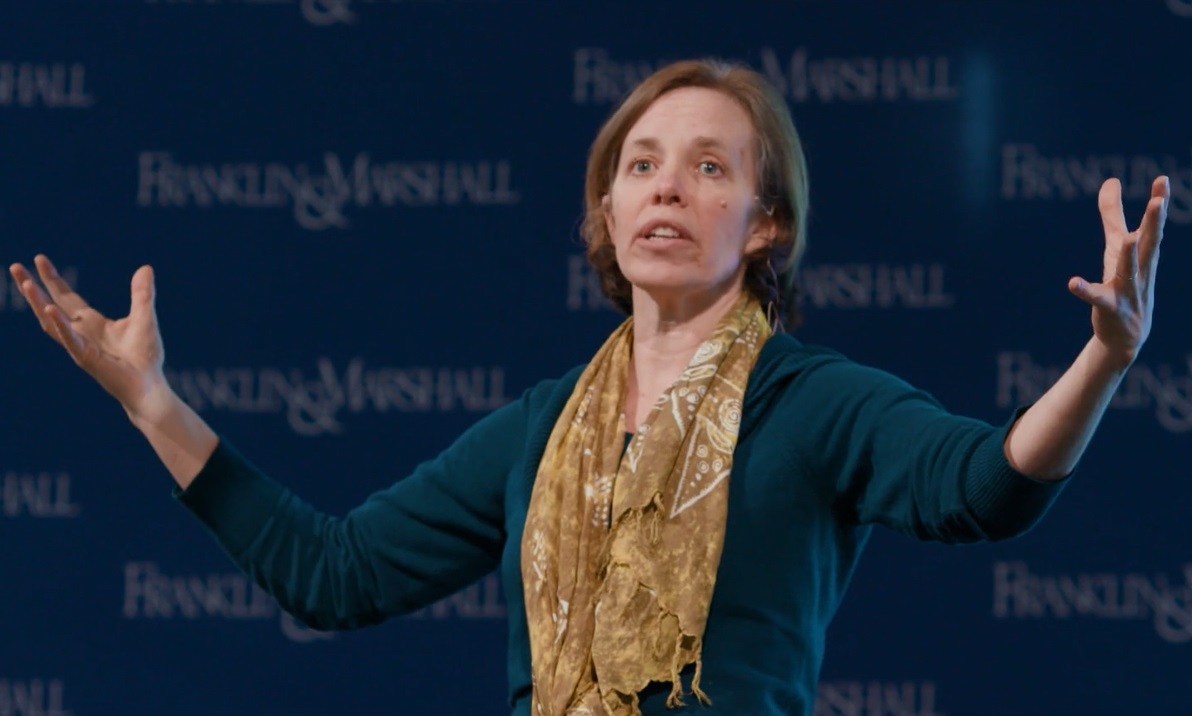
Annalisa Crannell speaking at Franklin & Marshall College in 2017

Annalisa Crannell is an American mathematician, and an expert in the mathematics of water waves, chaos theory, and geometric perspective. She is a professor of mathematics at Franklin & Marshall College.

== Education ==
Crannell is the daughter of nuclear physicist Hall L. Crannell of the Catholic University of America, and solar physicist Carol Jo Crannell of the NASA Goddard Space Flight Center. As a high school student, her favorite subject was Spanish, and she was indifferent to mathematics.

She entered Bryn Mawr College intending to continue her language studies, but was inspired to change majors to mathematics by professor Mario Martelli, who noted her talent in a calculus class and encouraged her to take a senior-level class in partial differential equations as a freshman. She graduated in 1986, with magna cum laude honors, and completed her Ph.D. in 1992 from Brown University, with Walter Craig as her doctoral advisor.

== Career ==
Crannell joined the faculty of Franklin & Marshall College in 1992. She was the founding Don of Bonchek College House (formerly South Ben College House), serving as don from 2005 to 2010.

She was section governor of the East Pennsylvania Delaware section of the Mathematical Association of America (2014-2016), and was a member of the executive committee of the Association for Women in Mathematics from 2012 to 2015. She has also chaired the Nominating Committee of the American Mathematical Society (2003–2005).

She has been the associate editor of Mathematics Magazine, published by the Mathematical Association of America (MAA), for over 15 years.

== Contributions ==
External audio
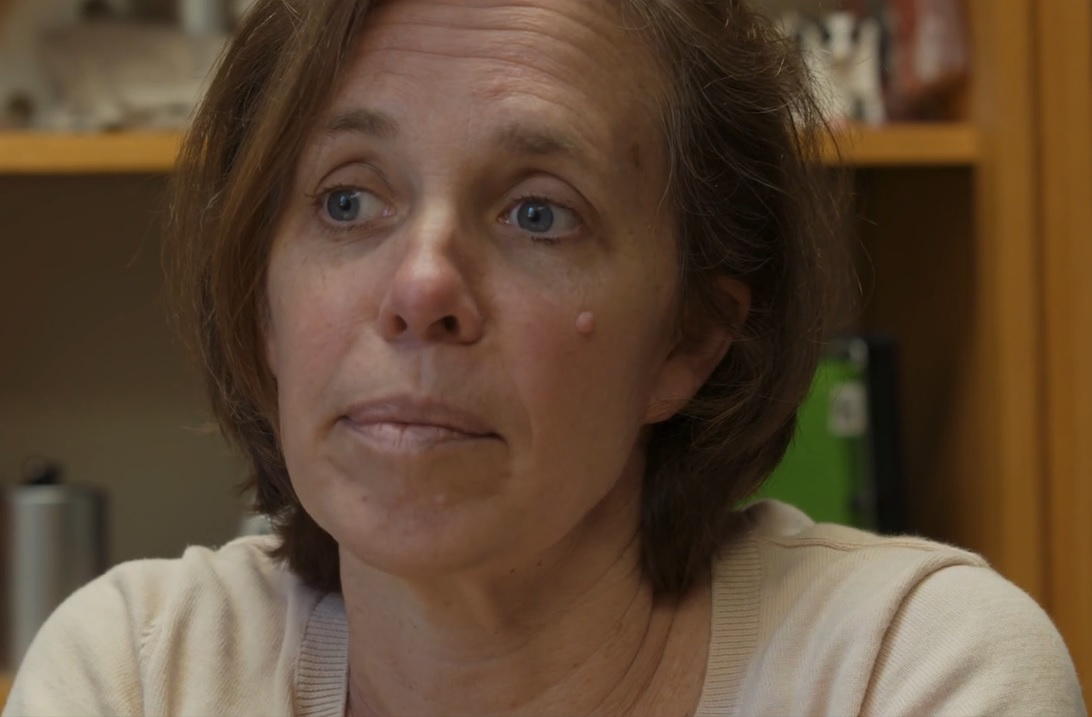
- “Mathematics professor Annalisa Crannell discusses her course on perspective and how to use math to see a work of art as the artist did”, Mathematical Moments, American Mathematical Society

Crannell's dissertation, The Existence of Many Non-Traveling, Periodic Solutions of the Boussinesq Equation, concerned the Boussinesq approximation for water waves.

She is the author or editor of the following books:

- Starting Our Careers: A Collection of Essays and Advice on Professional Development from the Young Mathematicians' Network (edited with Curtis D. Bennett, American Mathematical Society, 1999)
- Writing Projects for Mathematics Courses: Crushed Clowns, Cars, and Coffee to Go (with Gavin LaRose, Thomas Ratliff, and Elyn Rykken, MAA, 2004)
- Viewpoints: Mathematical Perspective and Fractal Geometry in Art (with Marc Frantz, Princeton University Press, 2011)
- Perspective and Projective Geometry (with Marc Frantz and Fumiko Futamura, Princeton University Press, 2019)

Her recent research has included studies of perspective in art, such as in the engravings of Albrecht Dürer. One of her techniques for understanding the perspective of artworks is to bring chopsticks to art galleries, which she uses as a convenient tool for finding vanishing points and, from these points, determining the best points to stand when viewing the art.

== Recognition ==
Crannell won the Deborah and Franklin Haimo Award for Distinguished College or University Teaching of Mathematics of the Mathematical Association of America in 2008. The award recognizes outstanding mathematics teachers "whose teaching effectiveness has been shown to have had influence beyond their own institutions".

Crannell won the Christian R. And Mary F. Lindback Foundation Award For Distinguished Teaching in 2016.

== Interests ==
Crannell ran in her first Ironman Triathlon on August 24, 2014.
