= Marion G. Crandell =

American war worker

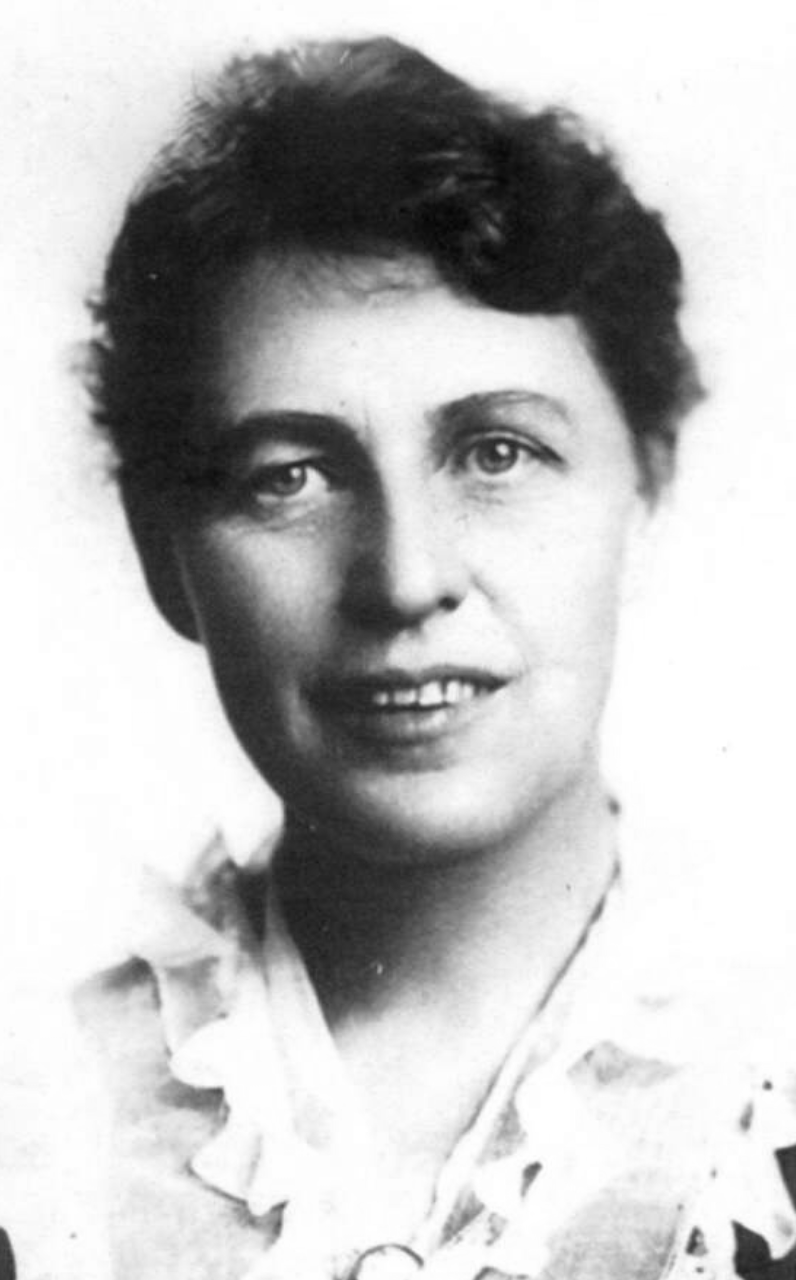
- Marion G. Crandell, from a 1926 publication
- Born: April 25, 1872; Cedar Rapids, Iowa
- Died: March 26, 1918 (age 45); France
- Occupations: Educator, war worker
- Known for: First American woman in active service killed in World War I

Marion G. Crandell (April 25, 1872 – March 26, 1918), sometimes seen as Marion G. Crandall, was an American educator and war worker. She was "the first American woman in active service killed in World War I."

== Early life and education ==
Crandell was born in Cedar Rapids, Iowa and raised in Omaha, Nebraska, the daughter of George Taylor Crandell and Anjeannette Adeline Taylor Crandell. Her father was an auditor for the Union Pacific Railroad. She graduated from Omaha High School in 1889, and studied French at the Sorbonne. She trained as a teacher the University of Colorado.

== Career ==
Crandell was a French teacher in Iowa, Nebraska, and California. She was on the faculty of Bellevue College in Omaha from 1911 to 1915.

After visiting her brother George in Alameda, California, Crandell volunteered to do war relief work in France. She arrived in France in February 1918, taught French to other volunteers, and worked in a canteen near the front lines. Crandell died in 1918, when an artillery shell struck the YMCA canteen where she was working, near Sainte-Menehould. She was 45 years old.

== Legacy ==
Crandell's grave is in Meuse-Argonne American Cemetery. There is a school building named for her in Davenport, Iowa, and historical marker. A section of Iowa highway also commemorates her. Her name was included on the war memorial at her alma mater in Omaha. In 2011, she was inducted into the Omaha Central High School Hall of Fame.
