= Rubik's 360 =

3-D combination puzzle

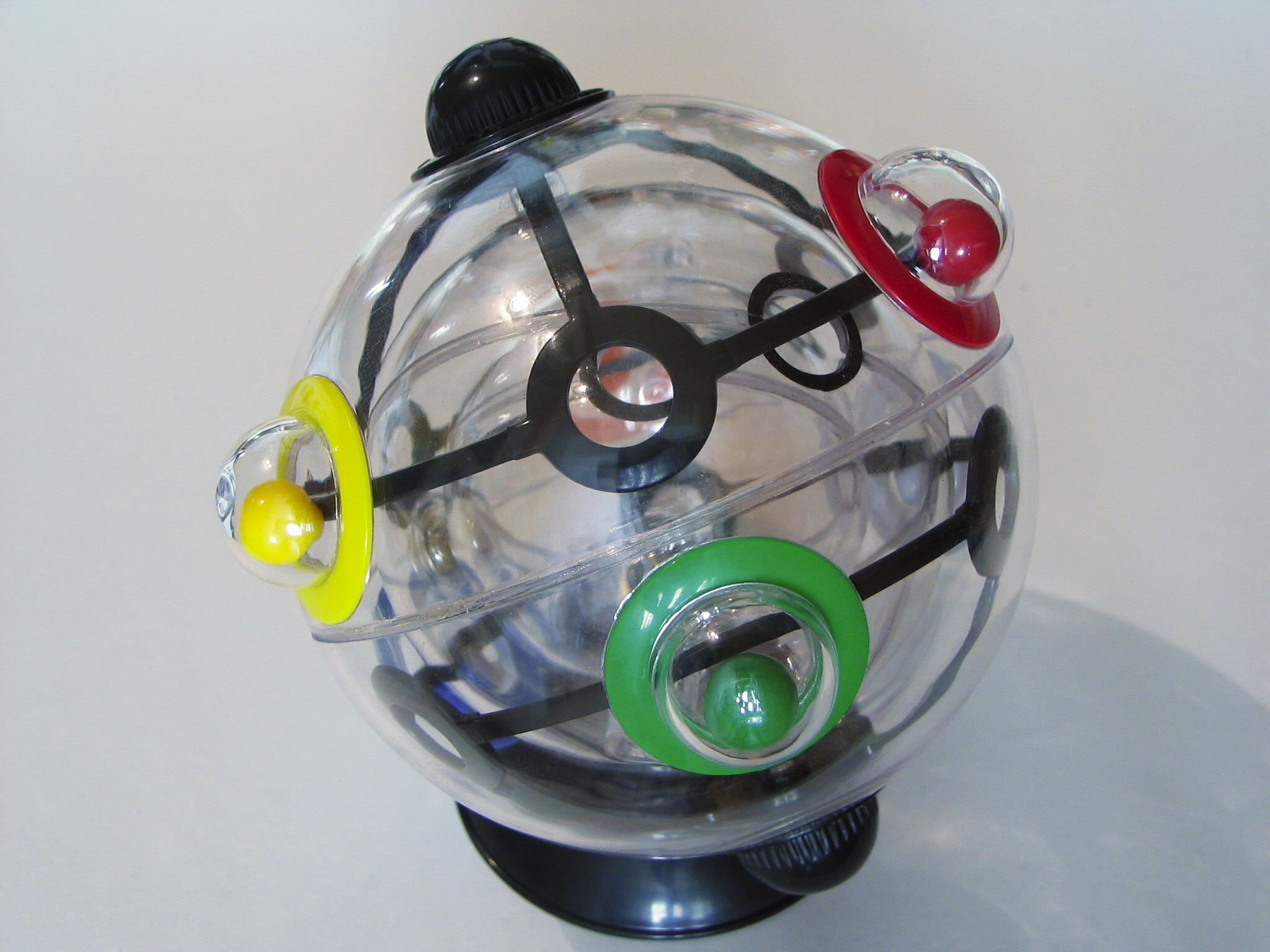
A solved Rubik's 360 puzzle

Rubik's 360 is a 3D mechanical puzzle released in 2009 by Ernő Rubik, the inventor of Rubik's Cube and other puzzles. Rubik's 360 was introduced on February 5, 2009 at the Nuremberg International Toy Fair ahead of its worldwide release in August.

In contrast to most of Rubik's puzzles, Rubik's 360 is a physical challenge requiring manual dexterity rather than learning and memorizing algorithms. The puzzle involves moving six balls, each a different color, from a central sphere to six color-coded compartments in the outer sphere. This is done by maneuvering them through a middle sphere that only has two holes. There are three spheres that make up the puzzle.

Like Rubik's Cube, Rubik's 360 has only one solution, but it cannot be solved by being broken apart. It is considered suitable for all ages and reviews described it as addictive and engaging.

== See also ==
- Ball-in-a-maze puzzle
- Perplexus
- Rubik's Revenge
