= Harrison R. Crandall =

American photographer and painter

Harrison R. Crandall (November 23, 1887 – December 14, 1970) was an American photographer and painter known for his images of Grand Teton National Park.
