= Figment (arts event) =

Art event in New York

FIGMENT is an annual participatory arts event that began on Governors Island in New York Harbor, United States in 2007, and has since spread to a number of other cities. The mission of FIGMENT is to provide a forum for community-based participatory art and experience. FIGMENT strives to build community among artists and participants, to foster the participatory arts in New York City, and to demonstrate a vision for the future of Governors Island as an international arts destination. FIGMENT is a community-based event organized and run by volunteers.

The event draws its name from New York's artistic heritage. Andy Warhol once commented that he would like his tombstone to have only one word on it: “Figment.” Warhol never got his wish; he has a traditional grave marker.

FIGMENT is based on 11 principles including participation, inclusion, decommodification and leave no trace.

Art projects are solicited for FIGMENT through a curatorial process, based on artistic merit, ambitiousness, and interactivity. FIGMENT focuses on art projects that demonstrate an ability to transform their environment and the perception of participants.

FIGMENT is produced by Figment Project, Inc., a 501(c)(3) not-for-profit organization registered in New York State. This not-for-profit organization was originally formed as Action Arts League, Inc., in 2006. The board of directors decided to rename the organization Figment Project, Inc., in December 2010, and the name change was acknowledged by the New York State Department of State on February 9, 2011.

The event is currently supported by individual donations and by grants. FIGMENT does not accept any corporate sponsorships.

== FIGMENT 2007 ==
FIGMENT was launched in 2007 as a one-day event on July 8. FIGMENT attracted over 60 participatory arts projects, and hosted over 2,600 participants.

== FIGMENT 2008 ==
In 2008, FIGMENT was a three-day event on June 27–29. Nearly 10,000 people attended the event, and attendance records were set for Governors Island for the most people ever on the island on a Friday (1,486), on a Saturday (5,305), and on a Sunday (3,174), and over a single weekend (9,965).

Two special projects include the City of Dreams Minigolf course (open from June 27 to October 12, 2008), and the Emergence exhibition (open from May 31 to July 26, 2008). Both of these special projects were funded by the Black Rock Arts Foundation. It is estimated that approximately 50,000 visitors to the island engaged with these exhibitions over the summer of 2008.

== FIGMENT 2009 ==
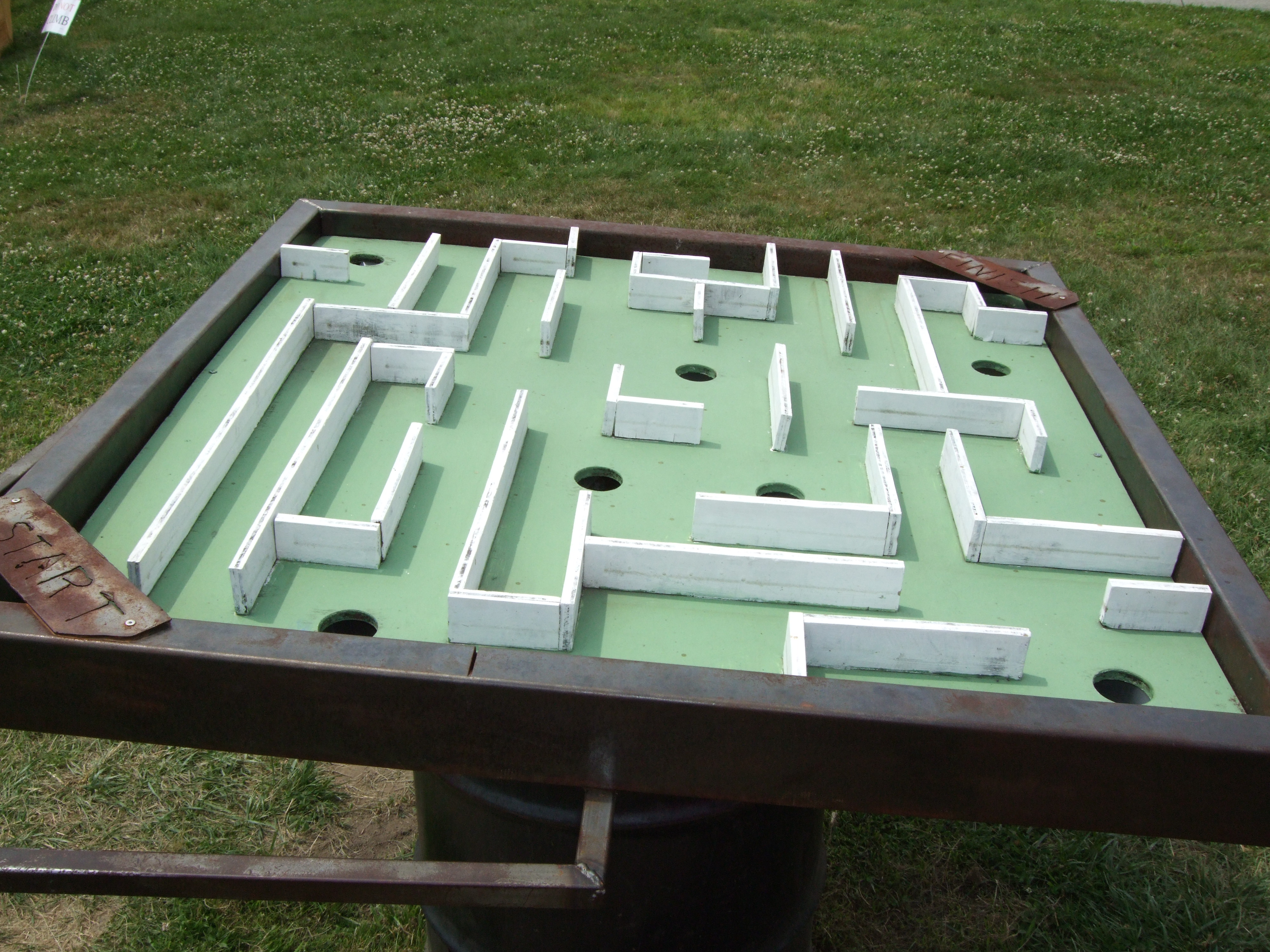
A miniature golf hole in the style of a large Labyrinth game, from the 2009 festival

FIGMENT 2009 took place on June 12–14 on Governors Island. In addition to the main festival, FIGMENT expanded the City of Dreams Minigolf Course to 18 holes, and added a season-long exhibition of interactive sculpture. Both of these projects together are called the "City of Dreams."

FIGMENT 2009 was attended by 13,331 people, including 1,139 participants on Friday, June 12; 5,488 participants on Saturday, June 13; and 6,704 participants on Sunday, June 14.

FIGMENT received six grants in 2009, including The Fund for Creative Communities, supported by the New York State Council on the Arts, and the Manhattan Community Arts Fund, supported by the New York City Department of Cultural Affairs. Both funds are administered by the Lower Manhattan Cultural Council. In addition, four large-scale sculptures in the City of Dreams season-long sculpture installation have received the 2009 Oscar M. Ruebhausen Commission from the Greenwall Foundation.

== FIGMENT 2010 ==
In 2010, FIGMENT added an event in Boston to its event in New York. FIGMENT Boston took place on June 5, 2010, along the Charles River in Cambridge, Massachusetts, in partnership with the Cambridge Arts Council, with approximately 10,000 participants who engaged with nearly 100 arts projects. FIGMENT New York took place on June 11–13, 2010, on Governors Island, with a total of 23,665 participants: 4,103 on Friday, 9,856 on Saturday, and 9,706 on Sunday.

FIGMENT created another summer-long minigolf course and sculpture garden in 2010 on Governors Island, and added an architectural competition to design and build a pavilion on the island as a center for arts activity. The City of Dreams Pavilion Design Competition was being jointly hosted by FIGMENT, the Emerging New York Architects (ENYA) committee of the New York Chapter of the American Institute of Architects (AIA), and the Structural Engineers Association of New York (SEAoNY). The competition received over 50 entries, and a jury of architects, journalists, and engineers selected Ann Ha and Behrang Behin's Living Pavilion as the winner of the competition. The Living Pavilion was built on the Parade Grounds on Governors Island, and opened in time for FIGMENT on June 11. The Living Pavilion, Minigolf Course, and Sculpture Garden were open on the island through October 3, 2010, and were visited by an estimated 200,000 visitors to the island.

== FIGMENT 2011 ==
In 2011, FIGMENT added events in Jackson, Mississippi and Detroit, Michigan, for a total of four events. The season began with the event in Jackson on May 21–22. Then next was Boston (relocated from Memorial Drive to the Rose Kennedy Greenway) on June 4–5. Then FIGMENT NYC on Governors Island on June 10–12. And finally FIGMENT Detroit on Belle Isle on August 6.

2011 brought much more interest and collaboration from public officials. Mayor Harvey Johnson visited FIGMENT Jackson on May 21. Mayor Thomas Menino of Boston issued a proclamation naming June 4 as "FIGMENT Boston Day" in the City of Boston. And New York State Senator Daniel Squadron visited FIGMENT NYC on June 10 and gave a press conference with Trust for Governors Island President Leslie Koch and FIGMENT Executive Producer David Koren.

FIGMENT NYC was named the Best Art Festival in New York by the Village Voice.

FIGMENT's brand received a design award in late 2011 by the AIGA.

In late 2011, FIGMENT received a grant from the National Endowment for the Arts for the first time ever, for its 2012 season.
