= Lynn Crandall =

American civil engineer (1888–1964)

- Born: December 8, 1888; Ithaca, New York, US
- Died: June 26, 1964 (aged 75); Idaho Falls, Idaho, US
- Education: Cornell University 1910
- Occupation: Civil Engineer
- Employer(s): Missouri Pacific Railroad, Twin Falls North Side Land and Water Co., U.S. Government
- Spouse: Bess L. Sickley
- Children: 2

Lynn Crandall (December 8, 1888 – June 26, 1964) was an American civil engineer who had charge of the water distribution of the Snake River, Salmon River and Henrys Fork of the Snake River for over 29 years.

== Early life and education ==
Lynn Crandall was reared on his father's farm before entering Cornell University on a Hiram Sibley Scholarship in 1906. He would be awarded this prestigious honor throughout his education. in Civil Engineering, the same field as taught by his uncle, Charles Lee Crandall, at that institution. Professor Crandall, who himself entered the freshman class at Cornell in 1868, would also see Lynn's brother, Carl Crandall, graduate C.E. 1912. It was Carl who was noted for stating "Surveying is better than golf". After Carl's death in 1968, it was noted that it had been 100 years since a member of the Crandall family had not either had a student or faculty member at Cornell. Lynn Crandall was honored in 1923 with the Fuertes Gold Medal

== Career ==
After a brief stint with the Missouri Pacific railroad, he received an appointment as junior engineer with the U.S. Geological Survey at Salt Lake City, Utah. He was employed as a junior engineer with this agency until 1916 when he joined the Twin Falls North Side Land and Water Co. in Jerome, Idaho. With the company he had the title of chief hydrographer. He was the first county surveyor of Jerome County, Idaho. In 1920, he was appointed by Judge Dietrich of the U.S. District Court for Idaho as commissioner of the court in charge of water distribution and study of water conditions in the Big Lost River Valley of Idaho and in 1930 elected watermaster of the Snake River Water District and at the same time appointed as District Engineer for the U.S. Geological Survey until retirement at age 70. In 1958 he was the recipient of the Distinguished Service Gold medal of the U.S. Department of Interior.
