= George Crandall =

George Crandall may refer to:

- George Crandall, character in The FBI Story
- George Crandall, character in The 13th Man
