= Jesse Armour Crandall =

American toy designer (1858–1920)

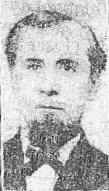
- Born: October 20, 1834; Westerly, Rhode Island
- Died: August 3, 1920 (aged 85); Brooklyn, New York
- Occupations: Inventor and toy-maker
- Spouse: Mary Dawson
- Children: Elsie, Lizzie, Annie, Hattie, Fred Dewitt Crandall
- Parent(s): Benjamin Potter Crandall; Mary Elizabeth Brown

Jesse Armour Crandall (October 20, 1834 – August 3, 1920) was an American inventor and toy-maker. He took out over 150 patents on toys in his 75 years of inventing. Crandall's father, Benjamin Potter Crandall, was also a toy-maker as well as three of Jesse's brothers (Benjamin, Charles Thompson and William Edwin). Unlike his brothers who remained primarily associated with their father's toy business in New York City, Jesse started his own company in Brooklyn. It was a friend, perhaps Henry Ward Beecher, who named him "The Child's Benefactor". This became his trademark and slogan.

== Baby and Doll Carriages ==
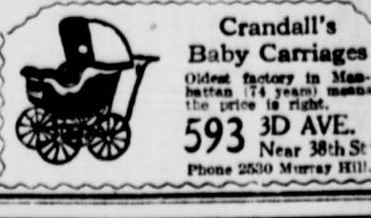
1916 advertisement for Crandall's Baby Carriages

Crandall's father had begun selling baby carriages in the 1830s which were billed as "the first baby carriages manufactured in America." Jesse designed a tool to drill the ten evenly spaced holes in carriage wheels at the same time when he was only eleven years old. Crandall was issued a number of patents for improvements and additions to the standard models. These included adding a brake to carriages, a model which folded, an oscillating axle, and designs for parasols and an umbrella hanger. An 1867 Crandall doll carriage model with a leather hood was once on display at the Museum of the City of New York. As of October 2010, it was still in the Museum's collection.

== Toy horses ==
Crandall is credited for inventing the Shoo-fly design of the rocking horse in 1859 and in 1861 he was issued a patent for a spring-loaded rocking horse. Both designs differed from the traditional bow rocker and were quite popular until the 1880 Marqua safety stand. Maqua's design was seen with disdain by purists. As a young man, after making a hobby horse nearly the size of a pony, he gave it to a boy who was to later become King Edward VII. The popularity of these larger toy horses affected adults also as author Nathaniel P. Willis wrote about it in Health and Happiness on Horseback. Actor Joseph Jefferson rode across the stage of what became the Winter Garden theatre on a Crandall designed horse. Benjamin P. Jr. was described as the "self-styled 'inventor of the hobby horse'" and was issued a patent for an improved model of combined rocking horse and swing in 1873. However, Jesse had patented what he called a hobby horse as shown in his 1859 patent application illustration.

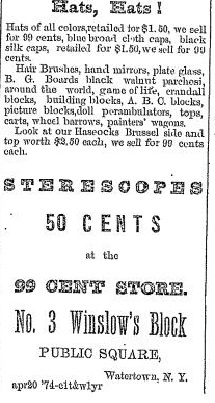
99 Cent Store advertisement including Crandall blocks

== Building blocks ==
The Crandall toy-makers included Jesse, his father and brothers and Jesse's cousin, once removed, Charles Martin Crandall. Also, Benjamin P. Crandall Sr.'s brother, Nathan T. Crandall, was listed as a toy-maker in 1840s business directories sharing the same address. Among the toys designed were children's building blocks with unique features. Charles M. Crandall's design of tongue and groove interlocking blocks was used to construct an enormous palace exhibited in the 1876 International Centennial Exposition held in Philadelphia. In 1880 the Crandall family provided an exhibit of an Egyptian obelisk weighing over 200 tons in New York's Central Park which was widely popular. That was followed by Jesse's design of nested blocks, which was patented in June 1881. These "nesting blocks" allowed for convenient storage and remain popular today. William Edwin Crandall was awarded a patent for a toy obelisk in September 1882.

== Other inventions ==
Other inventions by Jesse included toys and non-toys. Various improvements on velocipedes came both from Jesse and his father. One of Jesse's involved use of a newly designed treadle and earned a gold medal at the 1876 Philadelphia Exposition; Crandall's Sandometer or "The beach brought to your home" in 1879 was a rather novel idea. An artificial arm was invented in 1915; however, Jesse did not attempt to patent it - probably from a combination of the money and effort spent on defending earlier patents and a philanthropic viewpoint. He also invented an invalid chair, which President Grover Cleveland's daughter was reported to use, One puzzle was a result of getting two painter's hooks entangled and the difficulty in getting them separated. This type of puzzle was still popular in the 1960s.

== See also ==
Charles Martin Crandall
