= Crendell =

Hamlet in Alderholt, Dorset, England

Coordinates: 50.920324°N 1.883574°W

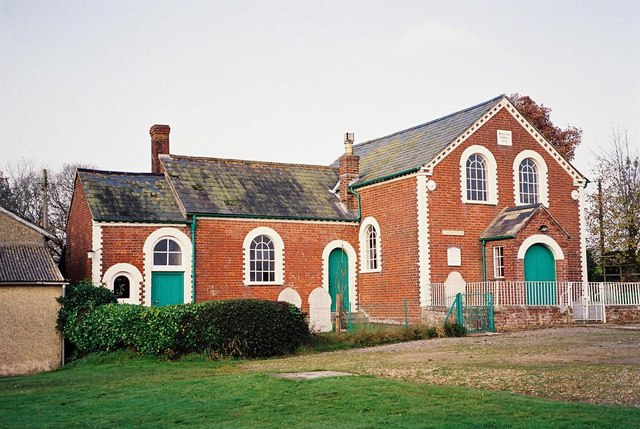
- Methodist Chapel, Crendell

- Location within Dorset
- OS grid reference: SU082134
- Unitary authority: Dorset
- Ceremonial county: Dorset
- Region: South West
- Country: England
- Sovereign state: United Kingdom
- Post town: FORDINGBRIDGE
- Postcode district: SP6
- Dialling code: 01725
- Police: Dorset
- Fire: Dorset and Wiltshire
- Ambulance: South Western
- UK Parliament: North Dorset

Crendell is a hamlet in the civil parish of Alderholt in Dorset, England. The hamlet is close to the Dorset-Hampshire border. Its nearest town is Verwood, which lies approximately 2.5 miles (4 km) south from the hamlet.

Crendell has about ten houses. Clay was once mined here for the local pottery industry in Alderholt. Crendell also has a Methodist chapel, which lies on the Hampshire side of the county border. The chapel, which was built in 1870, closed in 2011.
