= Lucien Stephen Crandall =

American inventor

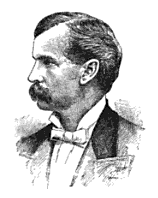
- Born: May 4, 1844; Portlerane, Broome County, New York, United States
- Died: February 4, 1919
- Spouses: Carrie Minturn (m. 1851–1867): Mary E. Root; Catharine Shercliffe; Florence M. Tallman
- Children: Abbie May Crandall, Carene Crandall, Hazel M. Crandall
- Parent(s): William Pierce and Emily (Bennett) Crandall

Lucien Stephen Crandall (May 4, 1844 – February 4, 1919) was an American inventor of typewriters, adding machines and electrical devices. Crandall gave his name to several typewriters, and he was also involved in the development of various machines, such as the project to produce the Hammond design at the Remington factory, or later the International typewriter.

== Early life ==
Born in Portlerane, Broome County, New York, Crandall was a descendant on his mother's side of Joseph Warren. He served as a private for three years during the American Civil War, surviving twelve major battles without injury.

== Career ==
In 1873, Crandall was employed as a salesman by James Densmore and George W. Yost of New York. Densmore and Yost had licensed Christopher Sholes and Carlos Glidden's patents and had established a contract with E. Remington and Sons to manufacture them. They gave Crandall the necessary tools and set him to work to perfect the typewriter. Crandall soon worked out an oscillating typebar which he obtained a patent for; this prints capital and lowercase characters by shifting the platen, and was later used in Remington typewriters.

Crandall assigned half of his patent to Densmore and Yost. After leaving the company and inventing his own typewriter, he started negotiations with E. Remington and Sons for the sale of the other half of his patent. Densmore learned of this, and wrote a letter to Remington denouncing Crandall as a "liar, scoundrel, a dishonest and immoral man". Crandall then brought an action against Densmore for defamation of character, claiming $100,000 in damages, saying that the letter had caused his negotiations with Remington to fail. Densmore's defense was that the charges made in his letter were all true.

In 1875, Crandall received a patent for a typewriter for blind users and in 1879 was granted a patent for a downstrike typesleeve machine, much like the one that he introduced in 1884 and set up the Crandall Typewriting Company.

== Typewriters ==
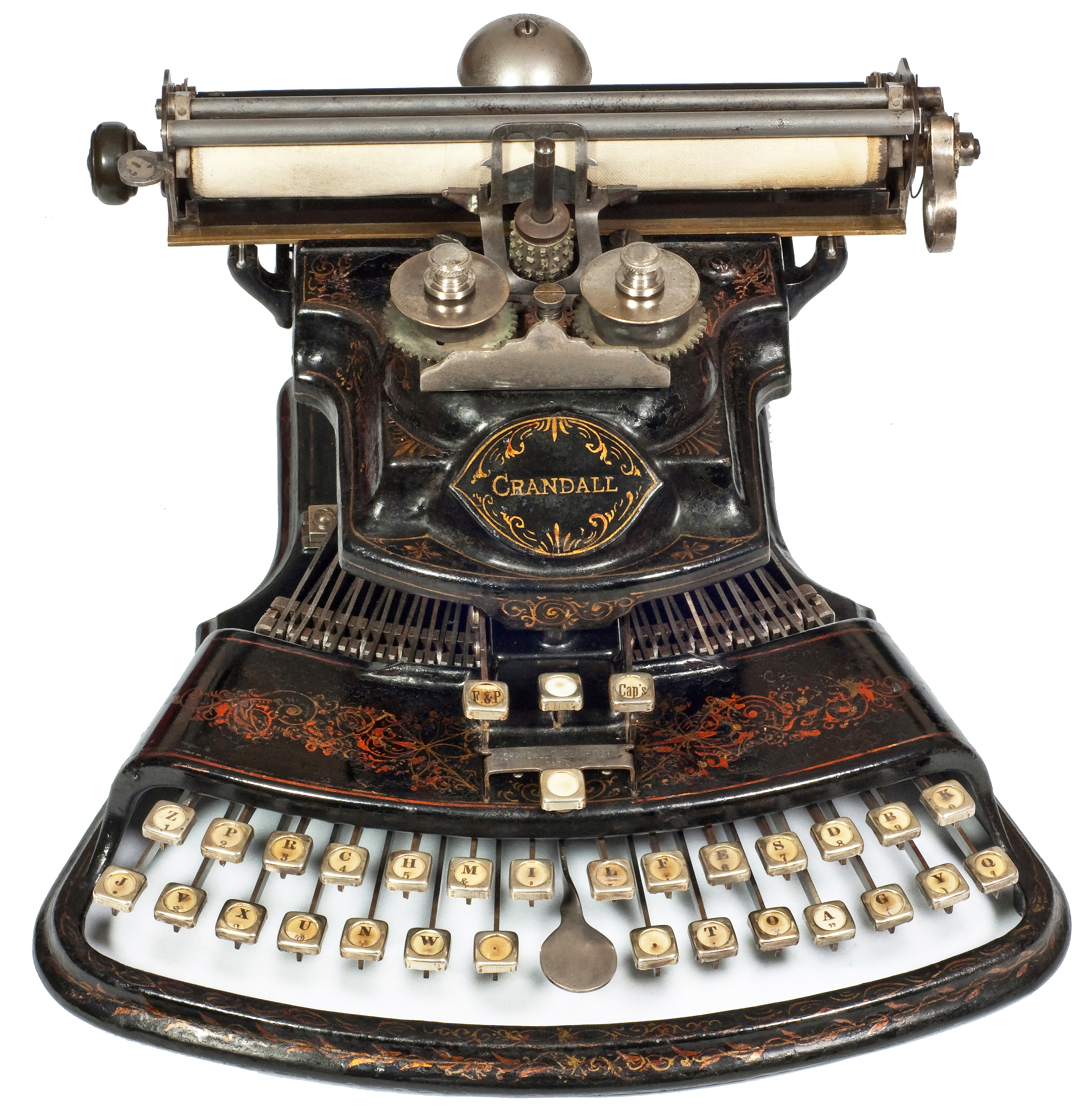
Crandall 1 typewriter, 1883

=== The Crandall Typewriter ===
The Crandall Typewriter was patented in 1881. The Crandall Machine Company began manufacturing in 1883 in Blodgett Mills, N.Y. for just a few months when the factory burnt down. The factory was rebuilt the following year in Syracuse N.Y. and finally the factory was situated in Groton, N.Y. in 1887. The Crandall used a type sleeve, as opposed to type bars, inked by a ribbon. It also used a non-standard two-row keyboard. It has been called "the first American visible and practically useful typewriter."

The type sleeve, the shape and size of one's finger, could easily be swapped out for different font styles and sizes. It has six rows of characters and was mounted obliquely on the first model. A key press rotated it to select the corresponding letter, bringing it down to the platen and locking it by temporarily engaging a pin in a hole.

The typist shifted to capitals with the "CAPS" key, which raised the type cylinder by two rows; the "F&P" key raised the cylinder by four rows, and was used for typing figures and punctuation. The lever between these two keys served as a shift lock; by pushing it backwards, one could type in capitals only. One special feature was that the period and comma each had their own key, and can always be typed regardless of the shift.

=== New Model ===
A reworked machine named the New Model appeared in 1885. It was produced in Groton from 1887, and sold in Europe from 1886 onwards by an agent in Amsterdam. The most significant changes from the previous machine were the slightly curved, two-row keyboard with 28 keys, and the vertical type cylinder which had 6 rows of 14 characters.

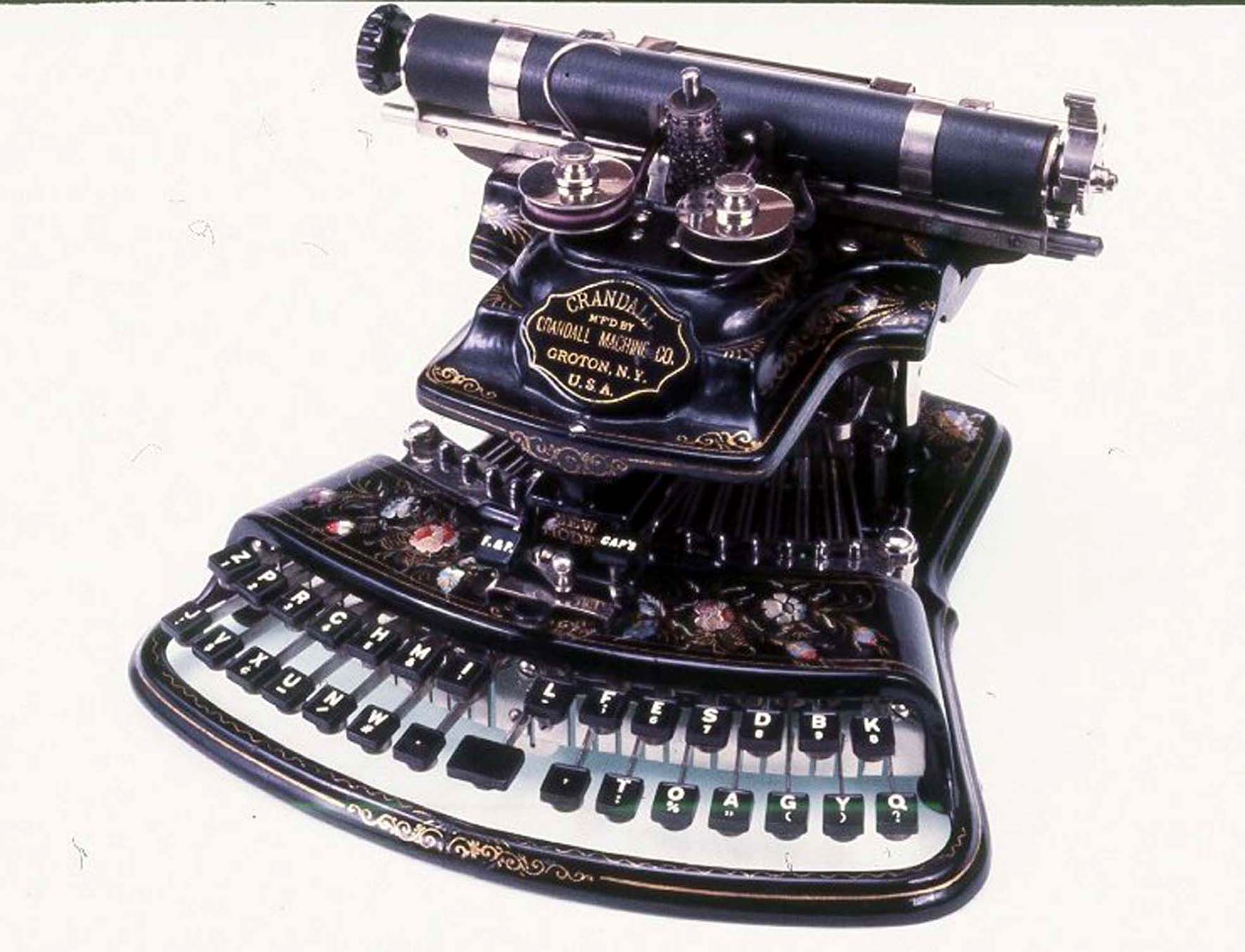
Crandall - New Model typewriter, 1887, USA

Later examples of this model were decorated with inlaid mother of pearl, painted roses and gold scrollwork, one of the most heavily decorated typewriters ever manufactured. Collectors often call the New Model Crandall the most beautiful of all typewriters. This reputation is said to be fully justified by the somewhat overdone yet elegant effect of the painted flowers with inlaid mother-of-pearl above the keyboard, the filigreed golden pinstripes, and the flower motifs that are found even on the back of the frame.

=== Universal Crandall No. 3 ===
This model was first marketed in 1893, and was built on the same principles as the New Model. It added a straight three-row QWERTY keyboard, and as Model No. 4 it also offered a two-color ribbon. The elaborate decorations had by now given way to a comparatively sober design.

=== Improved Crandall ===
The Improved Crandall of 1895 was completely different from the previous machines, and it is debatable whether it ever entered production.
