= Charles Martin Crandall =

American inventor and toy-maker

- Born: May 30, 1833; Montrose, Pennsylvania
- Died: June 25, 1905 (aged 72); Waverly, New York
- Burial place: Montrose, Pennsylvania
- Occupations: Inventor and toy-maker
- Spouse: Susan Elizabeth Kress
- Children: Fred, Benjamin, Jesse, Fanny Crandall
- Parent(s): Asa Crandall; Matilda Saunders
- Relatives: Jesse Armour Crandall

Charles Martin Crandall (May 30, 1833 – June 25, 1905) was an American inventor and toy-maker. He was best known for various toy blocks, "Crandall's Acrobats", "Noah's Dominoes", "Illuminated Pictorial Alphabet", "District School", "Menagerie", "Pigs in Clover" game and numerous other games and wooden toys such as wooden trains with interconnecting cars. Crandall began working in his father's woodworking and furniture factory in Covington, Pennsylvania and at the age of twelve began inventing toys. When his father died in 1849, Crandall took over the factory at age sixteen.

== Crandall's blocks ==
By 1866, Crandall had moved the company to Montrose, Pennsylvania and was into the manufacturing of croquet sets. He experimented with fastening the corners of boxes by using grooves and tongues instead of nailing. As his sons were convalescing from scarlet fever, he took some pieces home and his children built various structures such as a house, bridge and fence from them. His children's physician saw the blocks and ordered some. As Crandall would later say, this "was the first sale of the famous Crandall's Building Blocks." In order to sell the blocks, rather than go to jobbers or dealers, Crandall went to P. T. Barnum. Mr. Barnum was so impressed that he gave them a place in his museum for several weeks. Sales of that product amounted to about $10,000 ($230,357 today). The following year sales tripled. Later, Crandall entered into a contract with Orange Judd and Company naming them sales agents for his blocks.

Other block designs included:

- Masquerade Blocks, which advertised 300 different pictures
- Expression Blocks, decades later to be known as "Changeable Charlie" ability to alter expressions by turning one or more blocks over
- Sectional Blocks, each block containing a part of a letter and all blocks would display the alphabet when completed
- Illuminated Pictorial Alphabet, touted as waterproof, non-toxic and durable
- Noah's Dominoes, domino markings on one side with half an animal printed on paper and pasted on the other side

== Crandall's acrobats ==
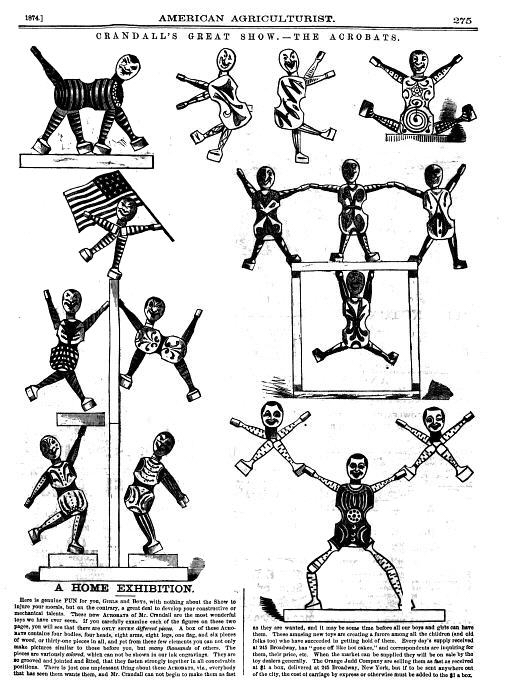
An 1874 advertisement of Crandall's acrobats

By adopting from his interlocking blocks, Crandall hit upon the idea of joining body parts such as arms and legs and fitting them onto horses or trapezes. The American Agriculturist (owned by Orange Judd and Co.) in its November 1874 issue advertised "The manufacturers are now making and selling 1500 boxes a day". By 1875, Crandall's factory building had grown to three stories. Crandall's Menagerie toy had a similar concept which incorporated a zebra, camel, giraffe, toucan and monkey holding a US flag all atop an elephant.

In 1885, financed by industrialist Moses Lyman, Crandall moved to Waverly, New York and started the Waverly Toy Works. The factory in Montrose then was managed by Fred W. Crandall, one of Charles' sons. The factory burned in August 1886 and was relocated in January 1887 to Elkland, Pennsylvania where it was reported to have a staff from between sixty and seven-five employees. Although Lyman was listed as proprietor and Crandall as general manager of the Waverly firm, Crandall was the genius behind its success as was soon to be seen.

== Pigs in Clover ==
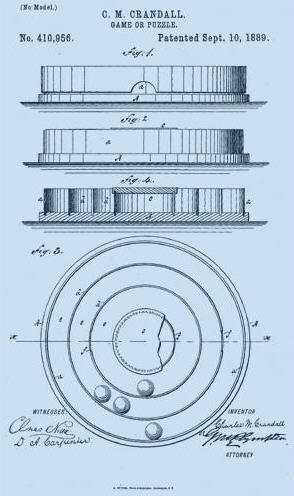
illustration from patent

In early 1889 Crandall invented a new game that swept the country simply called "Pigs in Clover". This was among the first or at least the most popular ball-in-a-maze puzzles in America. The "pigs" were marbles and the solver was required to manipulate them in such a manner as to locate each within a set of concentric circles on the puzzle. As the Waverly Free Press reported, "The toy works are turning out eight thousand of 'Pigs in Clover' a day, and are twenty days behind with their orders". It was reported a philanthropist in Kingston ordered enough puzzles for every inmate in the Ulster county jail and the almshouses of the city and county. The popularity of this invention, like many of Crandall's toys, reached beyond the American borders. An article in the Chatham (NY) Republican stated "The English are squealing because our American 'Pigs in Clover' have been introduced at the Court of St. James. They are declaring them not puzzles at all, only Yankee bu[n]kum." Mark Twain mentions the game in his book The American Claimant.

=== The game and politicians ===
The game was a source of political fodder and amusement. The March 13, 1889 issue of the New York Tribune reported Senator William M. Evarts purchased one from a street fakir in order to get rid of him. He took the puzzle home and worked it for hours. The following morning he brought it with him into Senate chambers where Senator George Graham Vest stopped by Evarts' desk, borrowed the puzzle and took it to a cloak room. Soon thereafter, he was joined by Senators James L. Pugh, James B. Eustis, Edward C. Walthall and John E. Kenna. A page was sent out to buy five of the puzzles and upon his return, the group engaged in a "pig driving contest". About 30 minutes later, Senator Vest announced his accomplishment of driving the last pig in the pen. A few days later a political cartoon in the March 17, 1889 issue of the New York World lampooned President Benjamin Harrison's advisors and cabinet members showing the group sitting around playing the game. The caption read "Will Mr. Harrison be able to get all these hungry pigs in the official pen?"

=== Imitators and others who claimed ownership ===
The popularity of the puzzle was exponential and many tried and a few were successful in recouping the rewards in selling fakes. Part of the problem, in addition to its rapid growth and inability to fulfill orders timely, was the lethargic process in obtaining the patent. Whether this was due to the lack of filing all the required paperwork or the government's lackadaisical response or a combination of both is unknown. Some counterfeiters would attempt to rename the game, such as "Pigs in Sty" or "Pigs Running Wild" or some other similar name. Lyman Moses was successful in obtaining a preliminary injunction in United States district court, northern Illinois, against one imitator named Burns for trademark infringement based on games called "greased pigs" and "pigs in the pen". By that time, Mr. Lyman had reported the factory production of 50,000 units/day and sales of over one million.

Sam Loyd was one of those who claimed ownership of "Pigs in Clover." Several obituaries of Loyd erroneously listed him as the inventor. Loyd fraudulently claimed to have invented several other popular puzzles, too, including the 15 puzzle and even the board game Parcheesi.

=== Popular culture ===
Pigs in Clover was used as a plot device, and part of the central theme of, HBO's Westworld series with a modified layout, but in the same circular box.
