= Charles Henry Crandall =

American author and poet (died 1923)

- Born: June 19, 1858
- Died: March 23, 1923 (aged 64); Stamford, Connecticut
- Occupations: Author, poet
- Spouses: Katherine Virginia Ferguson; Mary Vere Davenport
- Children: Helen, Arthur Irwin, Robert Ferguson, Roland Crandall, Clarence Herbert, Arthur H. Crandall
- Parent(s): Charles Henry Sargent Crandall; Mary Carmichael Mills

Charles Henry Crandall (June 19, 1858 – March 23, 1923) was an American author and poet. He was a noted farmer and had become active in real estate having amassed 270 acres (1.1 km^{2}) in Stamford, Connecticut, by 1910. Crandall was a council member of the Stamford Rural Association, and a member of the Stamford Historical Society.

== Early life ==
Crandall was born on a farm in Greenwich, New York, in 1858. His father served in various capacities as a public official within the state of New York. These included as a member of the legislature, assistant assessor, internal revenue collector, money order clerk in the post office and a number of positions in the New York Custom House. Crandall attended Greenwich Academy, but did not matriculate from an institution of higher learning. After spending the first seventeen years of his life as a farmer, he went into the mercantile business for five years, then began a literary career.

== Literary accomplishments ==
After working as a reporter for the New York Tribune and the New York Globe, he moved to Connecticut in 1886 as a result of ill health. He called his tenure with New York with the roles of reporter, correspondent and editor, his "university years". In 1890 he published "Representative Sonnets by American Poets" with an exhaustive essay on the sonnet. Thereafter, he published a number of volumes of his own works from collections previously printed in newspapers and magazines in America. These publications included The Century Magazine, Harper's, Atlantic Monthly, The Outlook (New York), Independent, Critic, Lippincott's Monthly Magazine, North American Review, and Outing, along with others. His early collections often had a rural theme and his poems and prose would often involve farming life, as he became a serious farmer. A 1914 article in Guide to Nature Magazine gave him the moniker "Crandall - the Farmer-Poet".

== Patriot ==
He had four sons who served in World War I, one of which, Robert Ferguson Crandall, died in combat in France. Despite this loss, he remained a stalwart patriot and in 1918 published Liberty Illumined and Songs for the Boys in Khaki. The Stamford Historical Society has 109 of his poems, stories and essays in either typewritten or long-hand form.

== Later life ==
In 1923, feeling despondent over increasingly ill health, he wrote a thank you note to his housekeeper and then committed suicide in his barn using a pistol. He was 64.

== Publications ==
- 1883 The Season
- 1890 Representative Sonnets by American Poets
- 1893 Wayside Music
- 1898 The Chords of Life
- 1899 Songs behind the Lines
- 1909 Songs from Sky Meadows
- 1918 Liberty Illumined
- 1918 Songs for the Boys in Khaki
