= Pre-Code Hollywood =

American film era (1920s–1930s)

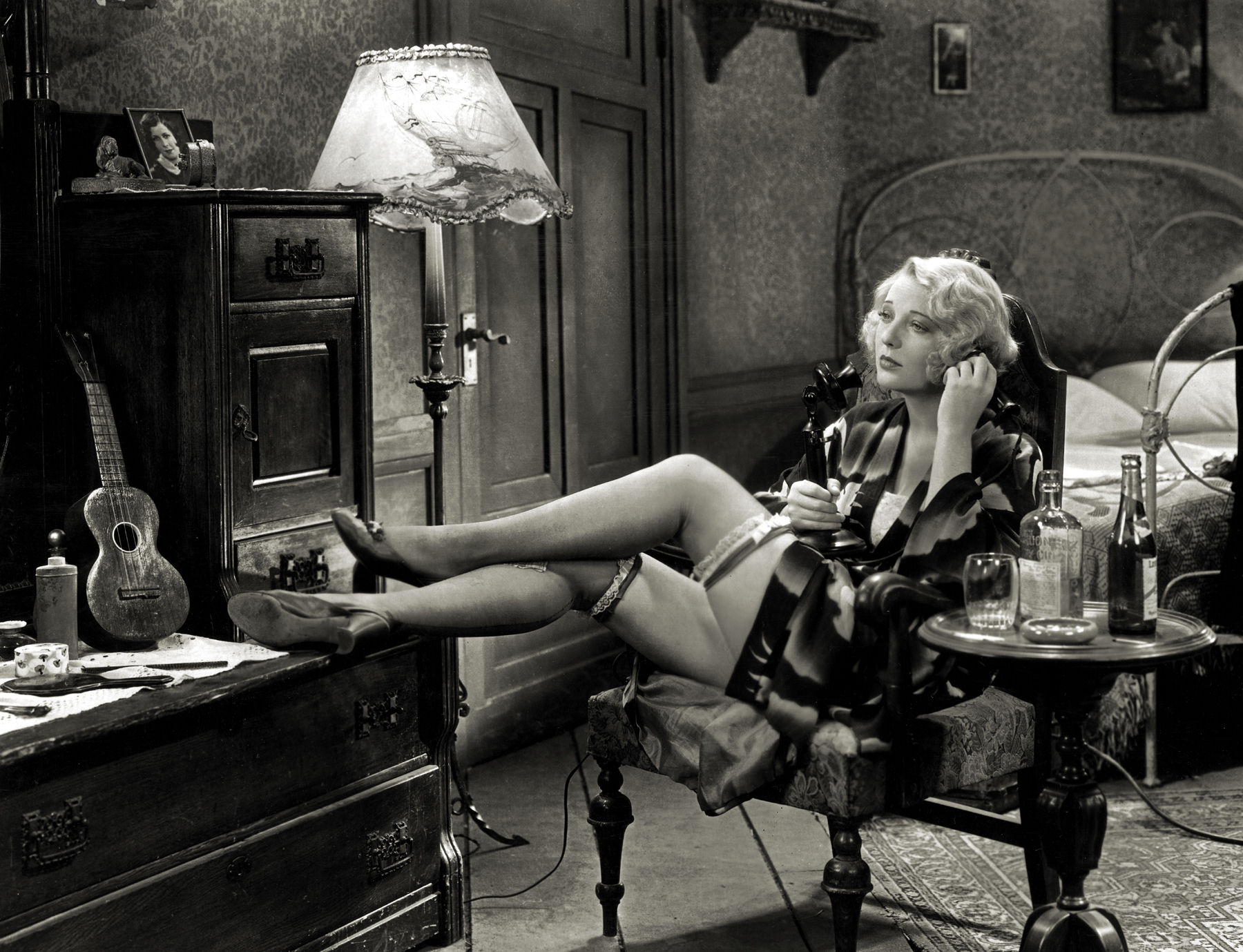
In this 1931 publicity photo, Dorothy Mackaill plays a secretary-turned-prostitute in Safe in Hell, a pre-Code Warner Bros. Pictures film.

Pre-Code Hollywood was an era in the American film industry that occurred between the widespread adoption of sound in film in the late 1920s and the enforcement of the Motion Picture Production Code censorship guidelines (popularly known as the Hays Code) in 1934. Although the Hays Code was adopted in 1930, oversight was poor, and it did not become rigorously enforced until July 1, 1934, with the establishment of the Production Code Administration. Before that date, film content was restricted more by local laws, negotiations between the Studio Relations Committee (SRC) and the major studios, and popular opinion than by strict adherence to the Hays Code, which was often ignored by Hollywood filmmakers.

As a result, some films in the late 1920s and early 1930s depicted or implied sexual innuendo, romantic and sexual relationships between white and black people, mild profanity, illegal drug use, promiscuity, prostitution, infidelity, abortion, intense violence, and homosexuality. Nefarious characters were seen to profit from their deeds, in some cases without significant repercussions. For example, gangsters in films such as The Public Enemy, Little Caesar, and Scarface were seen by many as heroic rather than evil. Strong female characters were ubiquitous in such pre-Code films as Female, Baby Face and Red-Headed Woman, among many others, which featured independent, sexually liberated women. Many of Hollywood's biggest stars, such as Clark Gable, Bette Davis, James Cagney, Barbara Stanwyck, Joan Blondell, and Edward G. Robinson, got their start in the era. However, other stars who excelled during this period, like Ruth Chatterton and Warren William (who is sometimes referred to as the "King of Pre-Code" and who died in 1948), would be largely forgotten by the general public within a generation.

Beginning in late 1933 and escalating throughout the first half of 1934, American Catholics launched a campaign against what they deemed the immorality of American cinema. Known as the Legion of Decency (formally, the National Legion of Decency), the campaign exerted intense pressure on the studio system to adopt the strict enforcement of the Production Code in July 1934. This, along with a potential government takeover of film censorship and social research seeming to indicate that movies which were seen to be immoral could promote bad behavior, was enough pressure to force the studios to capitulate to greater oversight.

== Origins of the Code (1915–1930) ==
=== Earliest attempts for the Code ===
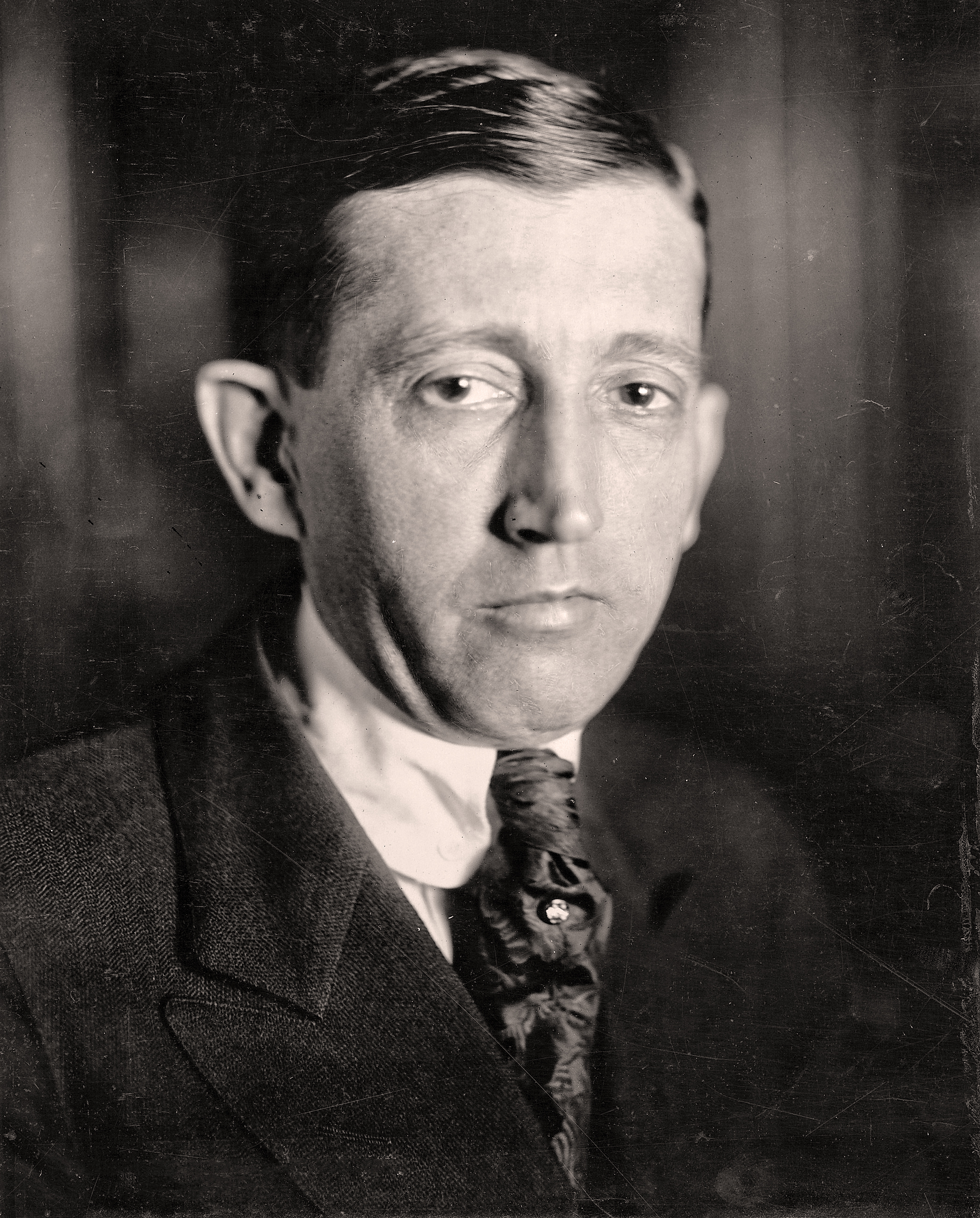
Will H. Hays was recruited by the studios in 1922 to help clean up their "Sin City" image after a series of scandals, especially the Roscoe "Fatty" Arbuckle manslaughter trial.

In 1922, after some risqué films and a series of off-screen scandals involving Hollywood stars, the studios enlisted Presbyterian elder Will H. Hays to rehabilitate Hollywood's image. Hays, later nicknamed the motion picture "Czar", was paid the lavish sum of $100,000 a year (equivalent to $1.5 million in 2025 dollars). Hays had previously served as U.S. Postmaster General under president Warren G. Harding and as the head of the Republican National Committee. At the time of his hiring, he was president of the Motion Picture Producers and Distributors of America (MPPDA); he held the position for 25 years and "defended the industry from attacks, recited soothing nostrums, and negotiated treaties to cease hostilities". Hollywood mimicked the decision Major League Baseball had made in hiring judge Kenesaw Mountain Landis as League Commissioner the previous year to quell questions about the integrity of baseball in the wake of the 1919 World Series gambling scandal; The New York Times called Hays the "screen Landis".

In 1924, Hays introduced a set of recommendations dubbed "The Formula", which the studios were advised to heed, and asked filmmakers to describe to his office the plots of films they were planning. The Supreme Court had already decided unanimously in 1915 in Mutual Film Corporation v. Industrial Commission of Ohio that free speech did not extend to motion pictures, and while there had been token attempts to clean up the movies before, such as when the studios formed the National Association of the Motion Picture Industry (NAMPI) in 1916, little had come of the efforts.

=== Creation of the Code and its contents ===
In 1929, Catholic layman Martin Quigley, editor of the prominent trade paper Motion Picture Herald, and Father Daniel A. Lord, a Jesuit priest, created a code of standards (of which Hays strongly approved) and submitted it to the studios. Lord's concerns centered on the effects sound film had on children, whom he considered especially susceptible to the medium's allure. Several studio heads, including Irving Thalberg of Metro-Goldwyn-Mayer (MGM), met with Lord and Quigley in February 1930. After some revisions, they agreed to the stipulations of the Code. One of the main motivating factors in adopting the Code was to avoid direct government intervention. It was the responsibility of the Studio Relations Committee, headed by Colonel Jason S. Joy, to supervise film production and advise the studios when changes or cuts were required.

This movement, soon formalised as the National Legion of Decency, in 1934 mobilised parishioners through sermons, printed leaflets and pages, and mass boycotting of all films deemed immoral. This economic pressure suffocated the studios to the extent that they accepted the new set of standards informally imposed upon them. By mid 1934 the campaign had become a significant national movement which triggered a transformation of the constraints within cinematic curation for years to come.

The Code was divided into two parts. The first was a set of "general principles" that mostly concerned morality. The second was a set of "particular applications", an exacting list of items that could not be depicted. Some restrictions, such as the ban on homosexuality or the use of specific curse words, were never directly mentioned but were assumed to be understood without clear demarcation. Miscegenation, the mixing of the races, was forbidden. The Code stated that the notion of an "adults-only policy" would be a dubious, ineffective strategy that would be difficult to enforce. However, it did allow that "maturer minds may easily understand and accept without harm subject matter in plots which does younger people positive harm." If children were supervised and the events implied elliptically, the code allowed what Brandeis University cultural historian Thomas Doherty called "the possibility of a cinematically inspired thought crime".

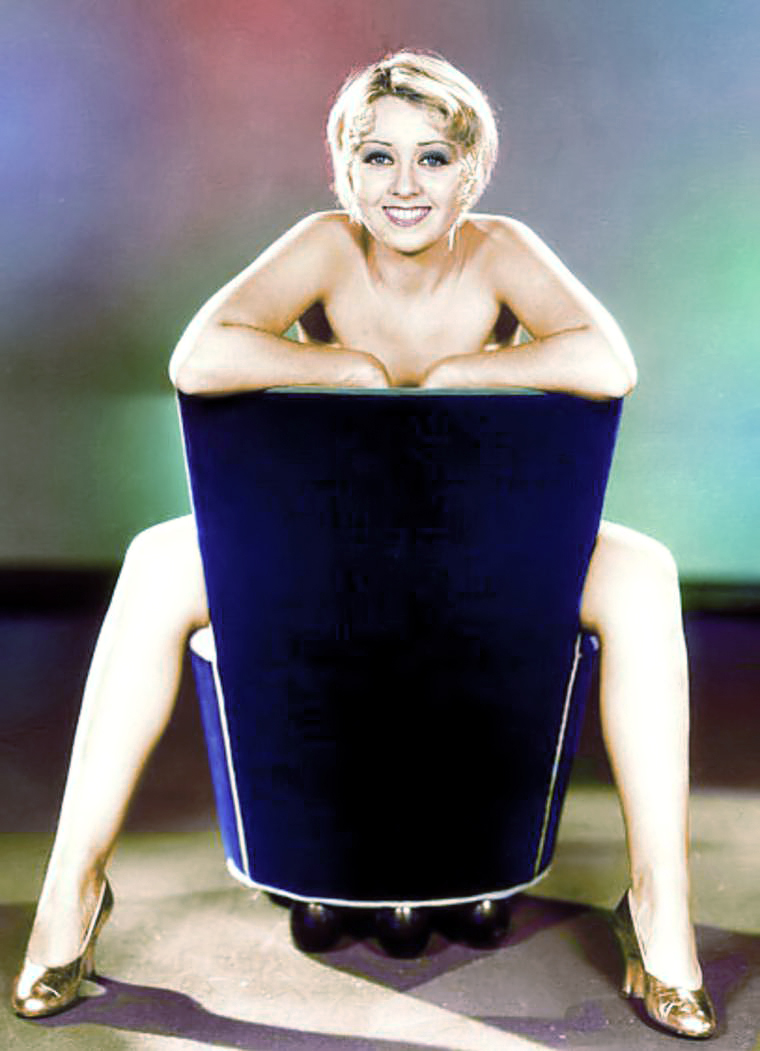
This 1932 promotional photo of Joan Blondell was later banned under the then-unenforceable Motion Picture Production Code.

The Code sought not only to determine what could be portrayed on screen, but also to promote conservative traditional values. Sexual relations outside of marriage could not be portrayed as attractive and beautiful, presented in a way that might arouse passion or be made to seem right and permissible. All criminal action had to be punished, and neither the crime nor the criminal could elicit sympathy from the audience. Authority figures had to be treated respectfully, and the clergy could not be portrayed as comic characters or villains. Under some circumstances, politicians, police officers and judges could be villains, as long as it was clear that they were the exception to the rule.

The entire document contained Catholic undertones and stated that art must be handled carefully because it could be "morally evil in its effects" and because its "deep moral significance" was unquestionable. The Catholic influence on the Code was initially kept secret, owing to the Anti-Catholic bias of the time. A recurring theme was "throughout, the audience feels sure that evil is wrong and good is right." The Code contained an addendum, commonly referred to as the Advertising Code, that regulated film advertising copy and imagery.

=== Enforcement ===
On February 19, 1930, Variety published the entire contents of the Code. Soon the men obligated to enforce the code – Jason Joy, who was the head of the Committee until 1932, and his successor, Dr. James Wingate – would be seen as generally ineffective. The first film the office reviewed, The Blue Angel, which was passed by Joy without revision, was considered indecent by a Californian censor. Although there were several instances where Joy negotiated cuts from films, and there were indeed definite, albeit loose, constraints, a significant amount of lurid material made it to the screen.

Joy had to review 500 films a year using a small staff and little power. The Hays office did not have the authority to order studios to remove material from a film in 1930, but instead worked by reasoning and sometimes pleading with them. Complicating matters, the appeals process ultimately put the responsibility for making the final decision in the hands of the studios themselves.

The Payne Fund Studies (1929–1933) provided scientific support for the enforcement of the code. The series of research projects evaluated the effects of motion picture on children, conducted by academic psychologists and sociologists. The findings acted as scientific support for the Code, they concluded that films had an impact on a child's sleep patterns, social behavior and attitudes due to repeated exposure to immoral themes such as sexual content and crime. The studies received widespread recognition and played an indispensable role in shaping societies concern of film content, despite the criticisms of methodological flaws. Their findings were cited by religious groups, policymakers and academics and formed a large pressure for stricter regulation of Hollywood prior to the enforcement of the Production Code Administration in 1934.

One factor in ignoring the Code was the fact that some found such censorship prudish. This was a period in which the Victorian era was sometimes ridiculed as being naïve and backward. When the Code was announced, The Nation, a liberal periodical, attacked it. The publication stated that if crime were never presented in a sympathetic light, then, taken literally, "law" and "justice" would become the same. Therefore, events such as the Boston Tea Party could not be portrayed. And if clergy were always to be presented positively, then hypocrisy could not be examined either. The Outlook agreed.

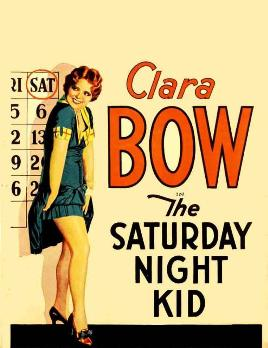
Clara Bow lifts her skirt on the poster for the pre-Code film The Saturday Night Kid (1929). Skirt-lifting was one of many suggestive activities detested by Hays.

Additionally, the Great Depression of the 1930s motivated studios to produce films with racy and violent content, which boosted ticket sales. Soon, the flouting of the code became an open secret. In 1931, The Hollywood Reporter mocked the code, and Variety followed suit in 1933. In the same year as the Variety article, a noted screenwriter stated that "the Hays moral code is not even a joke any more; it's just a memory."

== Early sound film era ==
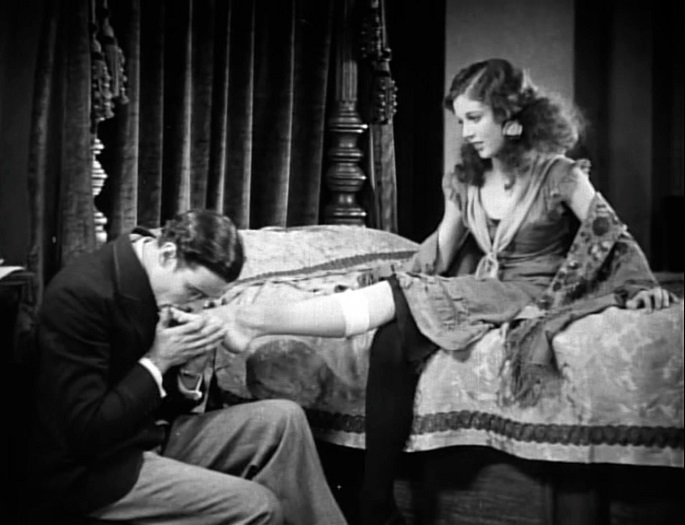
Nils Asther kissing 15-year-old Loretta Young's foot in a scene from the silent film Laugh, Clown, Laugh (1928), before the introduction of the 1930 code.

Although the liberalization of sexuality in American film had increased during the 1920s, the pre-Code era is either dated generally to the start of the sound film era, or more specifically to March 1930, when the Hays Code was first written. Over the protests of NAMPI, New York became the first state to take advantage of the Supreme Court's 1915 decision in Mutual Film vs. Ohio by instituting a censorship board in 1921. Virginia followed suit the next year, and eight individual states had a board by the advent of sound film.

Many of these boards were ineffectual. By the 1920s, the New York stage, a frequent source of subsequent screen material, had topless shows; performances were filled with profanity, mature subject matter, and sexually suggestive dialogue. Early during the sound system conversion process, it became apparent that what might be acceptable in New York would not be so in Kansas. In 1927, Hays suggested studio executives form a committee to discuss film censorship. Irving Thalberg of Metro-Goldwyn-Mayer (MGM), Sol Wurtzel of Fox, and E. H. Allen of Paramount responded by collaborating on a list they called the "Don'ts and Be Carefuls", based on items that were challenged by local censor boards, and which consisted of eleven subjects best avoided, and twenty-six to be handled very carefully. The Federal Trade Commission (FTC) approved the list, and Hays created the Studio Relations Committee (SRC) to oversee its implementation. However, there was still no way to enforce these tenets. The controversy surrounding film standards came to a head in 1929.

Director Cecil B. DeMille was responsible for the increasing discussion of sex in cinema in the 1920s. Starting with Male and Female (1919), he made a series of films that examined sex and were highly successful. Films featuring Hollywood's original "It girl" Clara Bow such as The Saturday Night Kid (released four days before the October 29th, 1929, market crash) highlighted Bow's sexual attractiveness. 1920s stars such as Bow, Gloria Swanson, and Norma Talmadge freely displayed their sexuality in a straightforward fashion.

== Hollywood during the Great Depression ==
The Great Depression presented a unique time for filmmaking in the United States. The economic disaster brought on by the stock market crash of 1929 changed American values and beliefs in various ways. The myths of rugged individualism, material progress, upward mobility, frontier opportunity and American exceptionalism wilted before a landscape of breadlines and Hoovervilles, forgotten men and fallen women. Due to the constant empty economic reassurances from politicians in the early years of the Depression, the American public developed an increasingly jaded attitude.

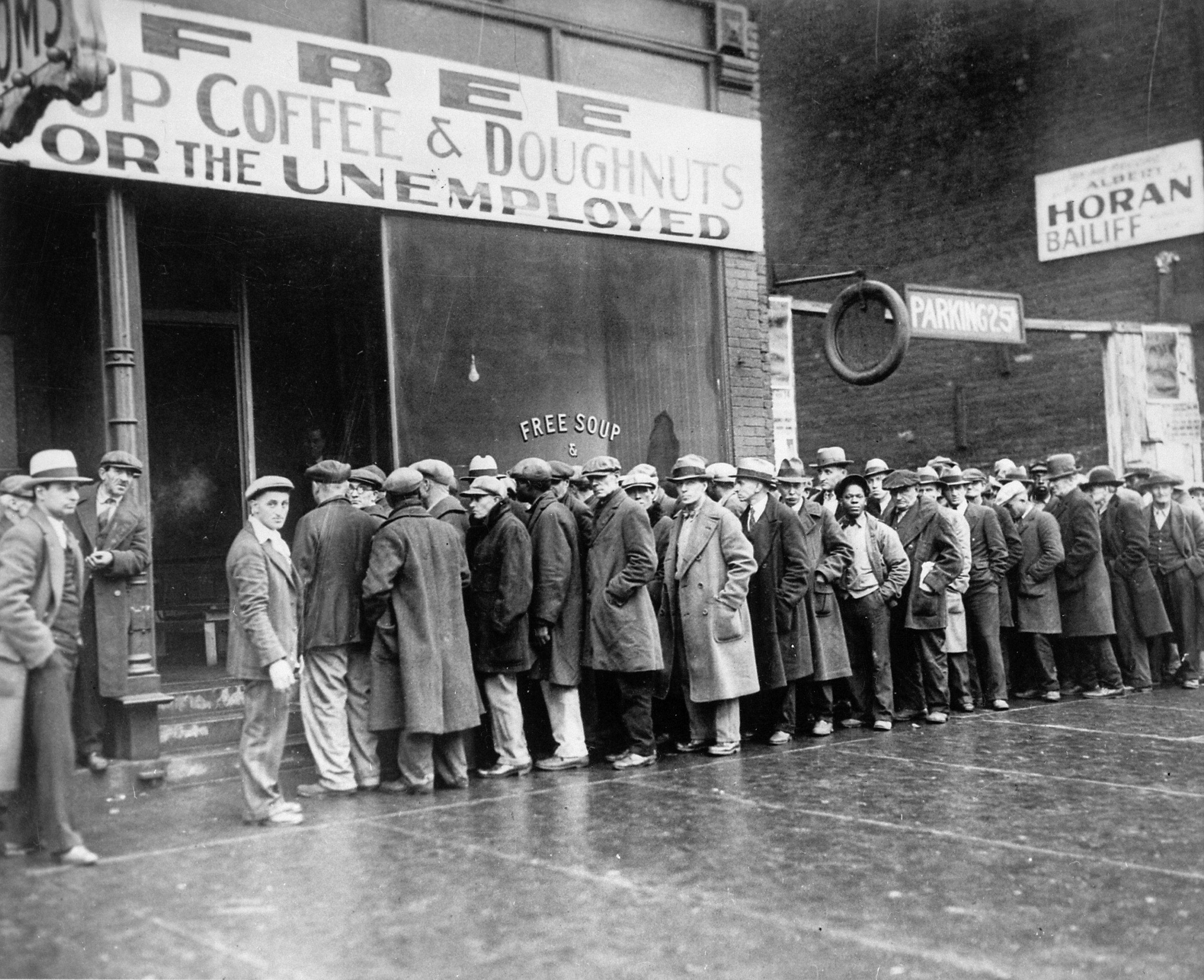
Unemployed men in 1931. The Depression profoundly influenced pre-Code Hollywood both financially and artistically.

The cynicism, challenging of traditional beliefs, and political controversy of Hollywood films during this period mirrored the attitudes of many of their patrons. Also gone was the carefree and adventurous lifestyle of the 1920s. "After two years the Jazz Age seems as far away as the days before the war", F. Scott Fitzgerald commented in 1931. In the sense noted by Fitzgerald, understanding the moral climate of the early 1930s is complex. Although films experienced an unprecedented level of freedom and dared to portray things that would be kept hidden for several decades, many in America looked upon the stock market crash as a product of the excesses of the previous decade. In looking back upon the 1920s, events were increasingly seen as occurring in prelude to the market crash. In Dance, Fools, Dance (1931), lurid party scenes featuring 1920s flappers are played to excess. Joan Crawford ultimately reforms her ways and is saved; less fortunate is William Bakewell, who continues on the careless path that leads to his ultimate self-destruction.

For Rain or Shine (1930), Milton Ager and Jack Yellen composed "Happy Days Are Here Again". The song was repeated sarcastically by characters in several films such as Under Eighteen (1931) and 20,000 Years in Sing Sing (1933). Less comical was the picture of the United States' future presented in Heroes for Sale that same year (1933), in which a hobo looks into a depressing night and proclaims, "It's the end of America".

Heroes for Sale was directed by prolific pre-Code director William Wellman and featured silent film star Richard Barthelmess as a World War I veteran cast onto the streets with a morphine addiction from his hospital stay. In Wild Boys of the Road (1933), the young man played by Frankie Darrow leads a group of dispossessed juvenile drifters who frequently brawl with the police. Such gangs were common; around 250,000 youths traveled the country by hopping trains or hitchhiking in search of better economic circumstances in the early 1930s.

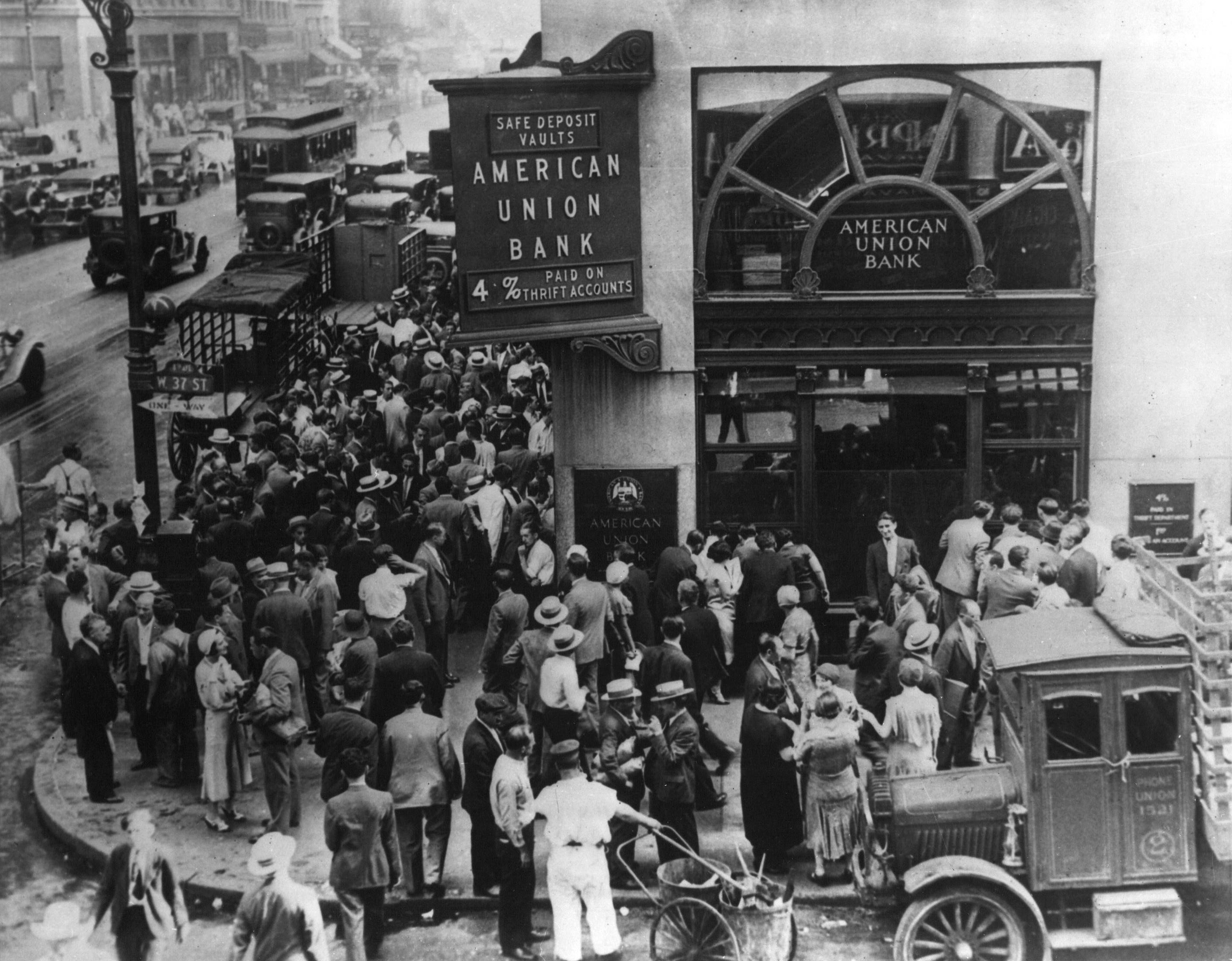
A crowd gathers around American Union Bank in New York City during a bank run early in the Great Depression. The mob mentality displayed in bank runs was portrayed in films like American Madness (1932), where Frank Capra depicted "the thin line between investor confidence and panic in Hoover's America".

Complicating matters for the studios, the advent of sound film in 1927 required an immense expenditure in sound stages, recording booths, cameras, and movie-theater sound systems, not to mention the newfound artistic complications of producing in a radically altered medium. The studios were in a difficult financial position even before the market crash as the sound conversion process and some risky purchases of theater chains had pushed their finances near the breaking point. These economic circumstances led to a loss of nearly half of the weekly attendance numbers and closure of almost a third of the country's theaters in the first few years of the depression. Even so, 60 million Americans went to the cinema weekly.

Apart from the economic realities of the conversion to sound, were the artistic considerations. Early sound films were often noted for being too verbose. In 1930, Carl Laemmle criticized the wall-to-wall banter of sound pictures, and director Ernst Lubitsch wondered what the camera was intended for if characters were going to narrate all the onscreen action. The film industry also withstood competition from the home radio, and often characters in films went to great lengths to belittle other media. The film industry was not above using the new medium to broadcast commercials for its projects, however, and occasionally turned radio stars into short feature performers to take advantage of their built-in following.

Seething beneath the surface of American life in the Depression was the fear of the angry mob, portrayed in panicked hysteria in films such as Gabriel Over the White House (1933), The Mayor of Hell (1933), and American Madness (1932). Massive wide shots of angry hordes, comprising sometimes hundreds of men, rush into action in terrifyingly efficient uniformity. Groups of agitated men either standing in breadlines, loitering in hobo camps, or marching the streets in protest became a prevalent sight during the Great Depression. The Bonus Army protests of World War I veterans on the capital in Washington, D.C., on which Hoover unleashed a brutal crackdown, prompted many of the Hollywood depictions. Although social issues were examined more directly in the pre-Code era, Hollywood still largely ignored the Great Depression, as many films sought to ameliorate patrons' anxieties rather than incite them.

Hays remarked in 1932:

The function of motion pictures is to ENTERTAIN. ... This we must keep before us at all times and we must realize constantly the fatality of ever permitting our concern with social values to lead us into the realm of propaganda ... the American motion picture ... owes no civic obligation greater than the honest presentment of clean entertainment and maintains that in supplying effective entertainment, free of propaganda, we serve a high and self-sufficing purpose.

== Social problem films ==
Hays and others, such as Samuel Goldwyn, obviously felt that motion pictures presented a form of escapism that served a palliative effect on American moviegoers. Goldwyn had coined the famous dictum, "If you want to send a message, call Western Union" in the pre-Code era. However, the MPPDA took the opposite stance when questioned about certain so-called "message" films before Congress in 1932, claiming the audiences' desire for realism led to certain unsavory social, legal, and political issues being portrayed in film.

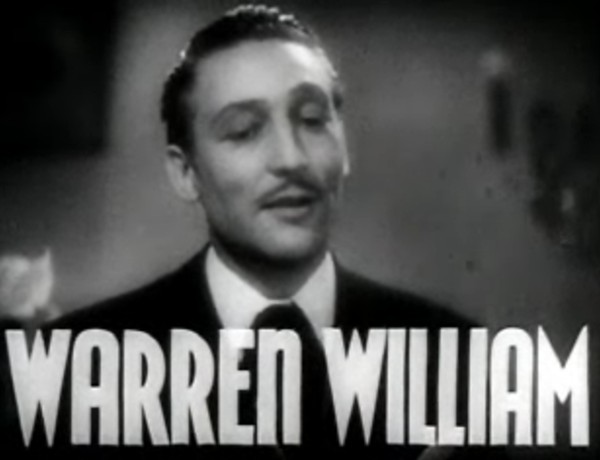
Warren William, described by Mick LaSalle as "one of the singular joys of the Pre-Code era", played industrialist villains and other lowlife characters.

Pre-Code films were usually comparatively short, but that running time often required tighter material and did not affect the impact of message films. Employees' Entrance (1933) received the following 1985 review from Jonathan Rosenbaum: "As an attack on ruthless capitalism, it goes a lot further than more recent efforts such as Wall Street, and it's amazing how much plot and character are gracefully shoehorned into 75 minutes." The film featured pre-Code megastar Warren William (later dubbed "the king of Pre-Code"), "at his magnetic worst", playing a particularly vile and heartless department store manager who, for example, terminates the jobs of two long-standing male employees, one of whom takes his own life as a result. He also threatens to fire Loretta Young's character, who pretends to be single to stay employed, unless she sleeps with him, then attempts to ruin her husband after learning she is married.

Films that stated a position about a social issue were usually labeled either "propaganda films" or "preachment yarns". In contrast to Goldwyn and MGM's definitively Republican stance on social issue films, Warner Bros. Pictures, led by New Deal advocate Jack L. Warner, was the most prominent maker of these types of films and preferred they be called "Americanism stories". Pre-Code historian Thomas Doherty has written that two recurring elements marked the so-called preachment yarns. "The first is the exculpatory preface; the second is the Jazz Age prelude." The preface was essentially a softened version of a disclaimer that intended to calm any in the audience who disagreed with the film's message. The Jazz Age prelude was almost singularly used to cast shame on the boisterous behavior of the 1920s.

Cabin in the Cotton (1932) is a Warner Bros. message film about the evils of capitalism. The film takes place in an unspecified southern state where workers are given barely enough to survive and taken advantage of by being charged exorbitant interest rates and high prices by unscrupulous landowners. The film is decidedly anti-capitalist; however, its preface claims otherwise:

In many parts of the South today, there exists an endless dispute between rich land-owners, known as planters, and the poor cotton pickers, known as "peckerwoods". The planters supply the tenants with the simple requirements of everyday life and; in return, the tenants work the land year in and year out. A hundred volumes could be written on the rights and wrongs of both parties, but it is not the object of the producers of Cabin in the Cotton to take sides. We are only concerned with the effort to picture these conditions.

In the end, however, the planters admit their wrongdoing and agree to a more equitable distribution of capital.

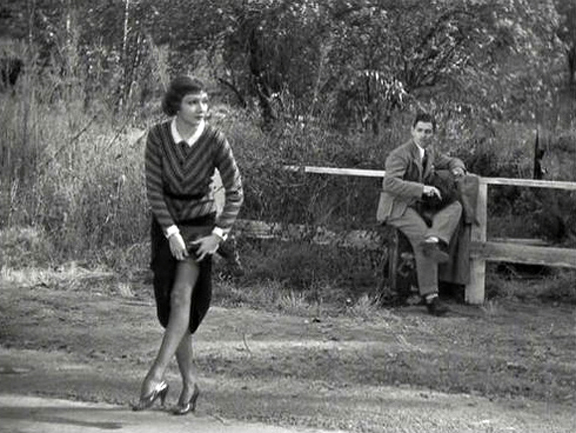
A famous scene from It Happened One Night, in which Claudette Colbert hitchhikes using an unorthodox method to attract a ride, after Clark Gable's failure to get one with his thumb.

The avaricious businessman remained a recurring character in pre-Code cinema. In The Match King (1932), Warren William played an industrialist based on real-life Swedish entrepreneur Ivar Kreuger, himself nicknamed the "Match King", who attempts to corner the global market on matches. William's vile character, Paul Kroll, commits robbery, fraud, and murder on his way from a janitor to a captain of industry. When the market collapses in the 1929 crash, Kroll is ruined and chooses suicide over imprisonment. William played another unscrupulous businessman in Skyscraper Souls (1932): David Dwight, a wealthy banker who owns a building named after himself that is larger than the Empire State Building. He tricks everyone he knows into poverty to appropriate others' wealth. He is ultimately shot by his secretary (Verree Teasdale), who then ends the film and her own life by walking off the roof of the skyscraper.

Americans' mistrust and dislike of lawyers was a frequent topic of dissection in social problem films like Lawyer Man (1933), State's Attorney, and The Mouthpiece (1932). In films such as Paid (1930), the legal system turns innocent characters into criminals. The life of Joan Crawford's character is ruined and her romantic interest is executed so that she may live free, although she is innocent of the crime for which the district attorney wants to convict her. Religious hypocrisy was addressed in such films as The Miracle Woman (1931), starring Barbara Stanwyck and directed by Frank Capra.

Many pre-Code films dealt with the economic realities of a country struggling to find its next meal. In Blonde Venus (1932), Marlene Dietrich's character resorts to prostitution to feed her child, and Claudette Colbert's character in It Happened One Night (1934) gets her comeuppance for throwing a tray of food onto the floor by later finding herself without food or financial resources. Joan Blondell's character in Big City Blues (1932) reflects that, as a chorus girl, she regularly received diamonds and pearls as gifts, but now must content herself with a corned beef sandwich. In Union Depot (1932), Douglas Fairbanks Jr. puts a luscious meal as the first order of business on his itinerary after coming into money.

=== Political releases ===
In the pre-Code film Gabriel Over the White House (1933), a U.S. President makes himself dictator – part of what the 1930s trade papers dubbed the "dictator craze".

Given the social circumstances, politically oriented social problem films ridiculed politicians and portrayed them as incompetent bumblers, scoundrels, and liars. In The Dark Horse (1932), Warren William is again enlisted, this time to get an imbecile, who is accidentally in the running for Governor, elected. The candidate wins the election despite his incessant, embarrassing mishaps. Washington Merry-Go-Round portrayed the state of a political system stuck in neutral. Columbia Pictures considered releasing the film with a scene of the public execution of a politician as the climax before deciding to cut it.

Cecil B. DeMille released This Day and Age in 1933, and it stands in stark contrast to his other films of the period. Filmed shortly after DeMille had completed a five-month tour of the Soviet Union, This Day and Age takes place in America and features several children torturing a gangster who got away with the murder of a popular local shopkeeper. The youngsters are seen lowering the gangster into a vat of rats when the police arrive, and their response is to encourage the youths to continue this. The film ends with the youngsters taking the gangster to a local judge and forcing the magistrate to conduct a trial in which the outcome is never in doubt.

The need for strong leaders who could take charge and steer America out of its crisis is seen in Gabriel Over the White House (1933), about a benevolent dictator who takes control of the United States. Walter Huston stars as a weak-willed, ineffectual president (likely modeled after Hoover) who is inhabited by the archangel Gabriel upon being knocked unconscious. The spirit's behavior is similar to that of Abraham Lincoln. The president solves the nation's unemployment crisis and executes an Al Capone-type criminal who has continually flouted the law.

Dictators were not just glorified in fiction. Columbia's Mussolini Speaks (1933) was a 76-minute paean to the fascist leader, narrated by NBC radio commentator Lowell Thomas. After showing some of the progress Italy has made during Mussolini's 10-year reign, Thomas opines, "This is a time when a dictator comes in handy!" The film was viewed by over 175,000 jubilant people during its first two weeks at the cavernous Palace Theater in Albany, New York.

The election of Franklin Delano Roosevelt (FDR) in 1932 quelled the public affection for dictators. As the country became increasingly enthralled with FDR, who was featured in countless newsreels, it exhibited less desire for alternative forms of government. Many Hollywood films reflected this new optimism. Heroes for Sale, despite being a tremendously bleak and at times anti-American film, ends on a positive note as the New Deal appears as a sign of optimism. When Wild Boys of the Road (1933), directed by William Wellman, reaches its conclusion, a dispossessed juvenile delinquent is in court expecting a jail sentence. However, the judge lets the boy go free, revealing to him the symbol of the New Deal behind his desk, and tells him "[t]hings are going to be better here now, not only here in New York, but all over the country." A box-office casualty of this hopefulness was Gabriel Over the White House, which entered production during the Hoover-era malaise and sought to capitalize on it. By the time the film was released on March 31, 1933, FDR's election had produced a level of hopefulness in America that rendered the film's message obsolete.

Adolf Hitler's rise to power in Germany and his regime's anti-Semitic policies significantly affected American pre-Code filmmaking. Although Hitler had become unpopular in many parts of the United States, Germany was still a voluminous importer of American films and the studios wanted to appease the German government. The ban on Jews and negative portrayals of Germany by Hitler's government even led to a significant reduction in work for Jews in Hollywood until after World War II. As a result, only two social problem films released by independent film companies addressed the mania in Germany during the pre-Code era (Are We Civilized? and Hitler's Reign of Terror).

In 1933, Herman J. Mankiewicz and producer Sam Jaffe announced they were working on a picture, to be titled Mad Dog of Europe, which was intended to be a full-scale attack on Hitler. Jaffe had quit his job at RKO Pictures to make the film. Hays summoned the pair to his office and told them to cease production as they were causing needless headaches for the studios. Germany had threatened to seize all the properties of the Hollywood producers in Germany and ban the import of any future American films.

== Crime films ==
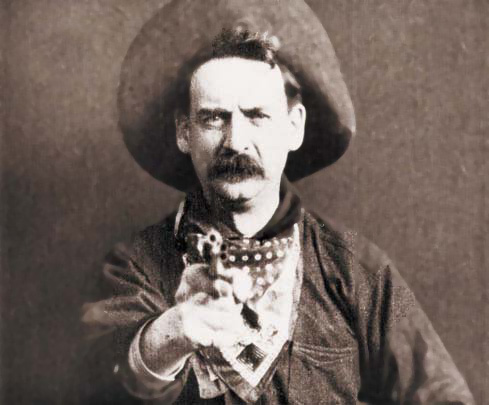
Scenes showing guns pointed at the camera (as in this shot from The Great Train Robbery, 1903) were considered inappropriate by New York State censors in the 1920s, and usually removed.

In the early 1900s, the United States was still primarily a rural country, especially in self-identity. D. W. Griffith's The Musketeers of Pig Alley (1912) is one of the earliest American films to feature urban organized crime. Prohibition's arrival in 1920 created an environment in which those who wished to consume alcohol often had to consort with criminals, especially in urban areas. Nonetheless, the urban-crime genre was mostly ignored until 1927 when Underworld, which is recognized as the first gangster movie, became a surprise hit.

According to the Encyclopedia of Hollywood entry on Underworld, "The film established the fundamental elements of the gangster movie: a hoodlum hero; ominous, night-shrouded city streets; floozies; and a blazing finale in which the cops cut down the protagonist." Gangster films such as Thunderbolt (1929) and Doorway to Hell (1930) were released to capitalize on Underworld's popularity, with Thunderbolt being described as "a virtual remake" of Underworld. Other late-1920s crime films investigated the connection between mobsters and Broadway productions in movies such as Lights of New York (1928), Tenderloin (1928), and Broadway (1929).

The Hays Office had never officially recommended banning violence in any form in the 1920s—unlike profanity, the drug trade or prostitution—but advised that it be handled carefully. New York's censor board was more thorough than that of any other state, missing only around 50 of the country's 1,000 to 1,300 annual releases.

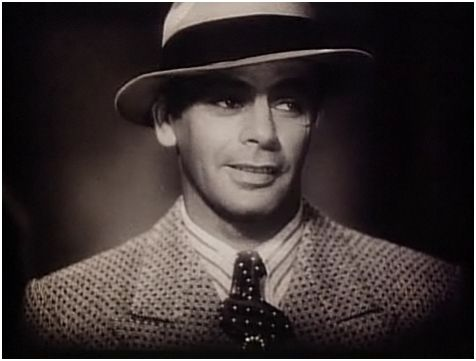
The public's fascination with gangsters in the early 1930s was bolstered by the extensive news coverage of criminals like Al Capone and John Dillinger, upon whom were based such characters as Scarface, portrayed by Paul Muni (1932).

From 1927 to 1928, violent scenes removed included those in which a gun was pointed at the camera or "at or into the body of another character". Also subject to potential censorship were scenes involving machine guns, criminals shooting at law enforcement officers, stabbing or knife brandishing (audiences considered stabbings more disturbing than shootings), whippings, choking, torture and electrocution, as well as scenes perceived as instructive to the audience as to how to commit crime. Sadistic violence and reaction shots showing the faces of individuals on the receiving end of violence were considered especially sensitive areas. The Code later recommended against scenes showing robbery, theft, safe-cracking, arson, "the use of firearms", "dynamiting of trains, machines, and buildings" and "brutal killings", on the basis that they would be rejected by local censors.

=== Birth of the Hollywood gangster ===
No motion picture genre of the Pre-Code era was more incendiary than the gangster film; neither preachment yarns nor vice films so outraged the moral guardians or unnerved the city fathers as the high caliber scenarios that made screen heroes out of stone killers.

— Pre-Code historian Thomas P. Doherty

In the early 1930s, several real-life criminals became celebrities. Two in particular captured the American imagination: Al Capone and John Dillinger. Gangsters like Capone had transformed the perception of entire cities. Capone gave Chicago its "reputation as the locus classicus of American gangsterdom, a cityscape where bullet-proof roadsters with tommygun-toting hoodlums on running boards careened around State Street spraying fusillades of slugs into flower shop windows and mowing down the competition in blood-spattered garages". Capone appeared on the cover of Time magazine in 1930. He was even offered seven-figure sums by two major Hollywood studios to appear in a film, but he declined.

Dillinger became a national celebrity as a bank robber who eluded arrest and escaped confinement several times. He had become the most celebrated public outlaw since Jesse James. His father appeared in a popular series of newsreels giving police homespun advice on how to catch his son. Dillinger's popularity rose so quickly that Variety joked that "if Dillinger remains at large much longer and more such interviews are obtained, there may be some petitions circulated to make him our president." Hays wrote a cablegram to all the studios in March 1934 mandating that Dillinger not be portrayed in any motion picture.

The film, Little Caesar (1931), an early Gangster film

The genre entered a new level following the release of Little Caesar (1931), which featured Edward G. Robinson as gangster Rico Bandello. Caesar, along with The Public Enemy (starring James Cagney) and Scarface (1932) (starring Paul Muni), were, by standards of the time, incredibly violent films that created a new type of anti-hero. Nine gangster films were released in 1930, 26 in 1931, 28 in 1932 and 15 in 1933, when the genre's popularity subsided after the end of Prohibition. The backlash against gangster films was swift. In 1931, Jack Warner announced that his studio would stop making them and that he himself had never allowed his 15-year-old son to see them.

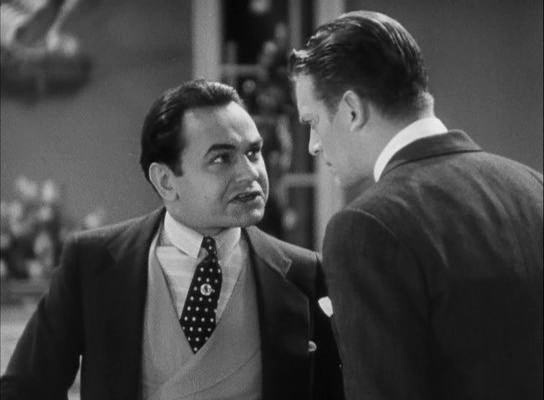
In Little Caesar (1931), Rico (Edward G. Robinson) confronts Joe (Douglas Fairbanks Jr.) for wanting to leave the gang.

Little Caesar is generally considered the grandfather of gangster films. After its release, James Wingate, who then headed New York's censorship board, told Hays that he was flooded with complaints from people who saw children in theaters nationwide "applaud the gang leader as a hero". The success of Little Caesar inspired Fox's The Secret Six (1931) and Quick Millions (1931), and Paramount's City Streets (1931), but the next big Hollywood gangster would come from Warners.

The infamous "grapefruit scene" in The Public Enemy (1931), with James Cagney and Mae Clarke

William Wellman's The Public Enemy (1931) featured James Cagney as Tom Powers. In the notorious "grapefruit scene", when Powers's girlfriend (Mae Clarke) angers him during breakfast, he shoves half a grapefruit in her face. Cagney's character behaved even more violently toward women in the gangster film Picture Snatcher (1933); in one scene, he knocks out an amorous woman whose feelings he does not reciprocate and violently throws her into the backseat of his car. In April 1931, the same month as the release of The Public Enemy, Hays recruited former police chief August Vollmer to conduct a study on the effect gangster pictures had on children. After he had finished his work, Vollmer stated that gangster films were innocuous and even overly favorable in depicting the police. Although Hays used the results to defend the film industry, the New York State censorship board was not impressed, and from 1930 through 1932, it removed 2,200 crime scenes from films.

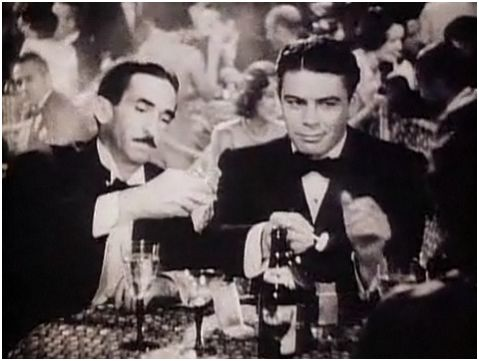
Both Osgood Perkins and Paul Muni light a match for Karen Morley's cigarette in the trailer for Scarface (1932). Morley chooses Muni's light, symbolically spurning her boyfriend for the fast-rising gangster.

Some critics have named Scarface (1932) as the most incendiary pre-Code gangster film. Directed by Howard Hawks and starring Paul Muni as Tony Camonte, the film is partially based on the life of Al Capone and incorporates details of Capone's biography into the storyline. The production of Scarface was troubled from the start. The Hays Office warned producer Howard Hughes not to make the film, and when the film was completed in late 1931, the office demanded numerous changes, including a conclusion in which Camonte was captured, tried, convicted and hanged. It also demanded that the film carry the subtitle "Shame of a Nation". Hughes sent the film to numerous state censorship boards, saying he had hoped to show that the film was made to combat the "gangster menace". After he was unable to get the film past the New York State censor board even after the changes, Hughes sued the board and won, allowing him to release the film in a version close to its intended form. When other local censors refused to release the edited version, the Hays Office sent Jason Joy to assure them that the cycle of gangster films of this nature was ending.

Scarface provoked outrage mainly because of its unprecedented violence, but also for its shifts of tone from serious to comedic. Dave Kehr, writing in the Chicago Reader, stated that the film blends "comedy and horror in a manner that suggests Chico Marx let loose with a live machine gun". In one scene, Camonte is inside a cafe while a torrent of machine-gun fire from the car of a rival gang is headed his way; when the barrage is over, Camonte picks up one of the newly released tommy guns that the gangsters had dropped and exhibits childlike wonder and unrestrained excitement over the new toy. Civic leaders became furious that gangsters like Capone (who was also the inspiration for Little Caesar) were being applauded in movie houses all across America. The screenplay, adapted by Chicago journalist Ben Hecht, contained biographical details of Muni's character that were so obviously taken from Capone that it was impossible not to draw the parallels.

One of the factors that made gangster pictures so subversive was that, in the difficult economic times of the Depression, there already existed the viewpoint that the only way to achieve financial success was through crime. The Kansas City Times argued that although adults may not be particularly affected, these films were "misleading, contaminating, and often demoralizing to children and youth". Exacerbating the problem, some cinema theater owners advertised gangster pictures irresponsibly; real-life murders were tied into promotions and "theater lobbies displayed tommy guns and blackjacks". The situation reached such a nexus that the studios had to ask exhibitors to tone down the gimmickry in their promotions.

=== Prison films ===
Prison films of the pre-Code era often involved men who were unjustly incarcerated, and films set in prisons of the North tended to portray them as a bastion of solidarity against the crumbling social system of the Great Depression. Sparked by the real-life Ohio penitentiary fire on April 21, 1930, in which guards refused to release prisoners from their cells, causing 300 deaths, the films depicted the inhumane conditions inside prisons in the early 1930s. The genre was composed of two archetypes: the prison film and the chain-gang film. Prison films typically depicted large hordes of men moving about in identical uniforms, resigned to their fate and living by a well-defined code. In chain-gang films, Southern prisoners were often subjected to a draconian system of discipline in the blazing outdoor heat, where they were treated terribly by their ruthless captors.

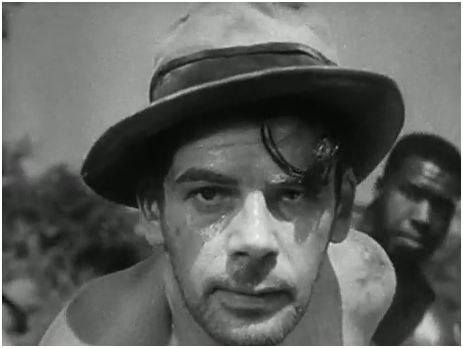
I am a Fugitive from a Chain Gang (starring Paul Muni, 1932) was based on the autobiographical memoirs of Robert E. Burns, who was himself a fugitive when the film was released. The film proved to be a powerful catalyst for later criminal-justice and social reforms.

The prototype of the prison genre was The Big House (1930). In the film, Robert Montgomery plays a squirmy inmate who is sentenced to six years after committing vehicular manslaughter while under the influence. His cellmates are a murderer played by Wallace Beery and a forger played by Chester Morris. The picture features future staples of the prison genre such as solitary confinement, informers, riots, visitations, an escape and the codes of prison life. The protagonist, Montgomery, ends up being a loathsome character, a coward who will sell out anyone in the prison to secure an early release. The film was banned in Ohio, the site of the deadly prison riots that inspired it. Numbered Men, The Criminal Code, Shadow of the Law, Convict's Code, and others, from no less than seven studios, followed. However, prison films mainly appealed to men and had weak box-office performances as a result.

Studios also produced children's prison films that addressed the juvenile delinquency problems of America in the Depression. The Mayor of Hell, for instance, featured children killing a murderously abusive reform-school overseer without retribution.

==== Chain-gang films ====
The most searing criticism of the American prison system was reserved for the depiction of Southern chain gangs, with I Am a Fugitive from a Chain Gang being by far the most influential and famous. The film is based on the true story of folk figure Robert E. Burns. Although based on reality, the Chain Gang film changes the original story slightly to appeal to Depression-era audiences by depicting the country as struggling economically, even though Burns returned during the Roaring Twenties era. The film's bleak, anti-establishment ending shocked audiences.

Laughter in Hell, a 1933 film directed by Edward L. Cahn and starring Pat O'Brien, was inspired in part by I Am a Fugitive from a Chain Gang. O'Brien plays a railroad engineer who kills his wife and her lover in a jealous rage, and is sent to prison. The dead man's brother is the warden of the prison and torments O'Brien's character. O'Brien and several others revolt, killing the warden and escaping with his new lover (Gloria Stuart). The film, rediscovered in 2012, drew controversy for its lynching scene in which several black men were hanged, though reports vary as to whether the black men were hanged alongside white men or by themselves. A film critic from The New Age (an African American weekly newspaper) praised the filmmakers for being courageous enough to depict the atrocities that were occurring in some Southern states.

== Sex films ==
The titles of pre-Code films were often deliberately provocative. Though violent, Safe in Hell (1931) was a socially modern, thoughtful film.

=== Promotion ===
As films featuring prurient elements performed well at the box office, after the crackdown on crime films, Hollywood increased its production of pictures featuring the seven deadly sins. In 1932, Warner Bros. formed an official policy decreeing that "two out of five stories should be hot", and that nearly all films could benefit by "adding something having to do with ginger". Filmmakers (including the shrewd Mae West) began putting in overly suggestive material they knew would never reach theaters in hopes that lesser offenses would survive the cutting-room floor. MGM screenwriter Donald Ogden Stewart said "[Joy and Wingate] wouldn't want to take out too much, so you would give them five things to take out to satisfy the Hays Office—and you would get away with murder with what they left in."

Films such as Laughing Sinners, The Devil's Holiday, Safe in Hell, The Devil is Driving, Merrily We Go to Hell, Laughter in Hell, and The Road to Ruin were provocative in their mere titles. Studios marketed their films, sometimes dishonestly, by inventing suggestive tag lines and lurid titles, even going so far as to hold in-house contests for thinking up provocative titles for screenplays. Commonly labeled "sex films" by the censors, these pictures offended taste in more categories than just sexuality. According to a Variety analysis of 440 pictures produced in 1932–33, 352 had "some sex slant", with 145 possessing "questionable sequences", and 44 being "critically sexual". Variety summarized that "over 80% of the world's chief picture output was ... flavored with bedroom essence." Attempts to create films for adults only (dubbed "pinking") wound up bringing large audiences of all ages to cinemas.

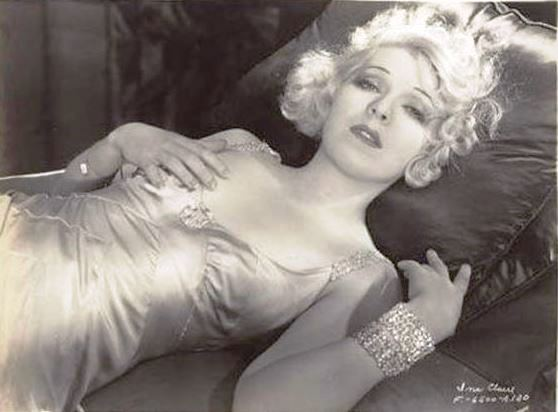
Some objected to publicity photos such as this 1932 shot of Ina Claire posing seductively from The Greeks Had a Word for Them.

Posters and publicity photos were often tantalizing. Women appeared in poses and garb not even glimpsed in the films themselves. In some cases actresses with small parts in films (or in the case of Dolores Murray in her publicity still for The Common Law, no part at all) appeared scantily clad. Hays became outraged at the steamy photographs, drawings and prose circulating in newspapers around the country for publicity. The original Hays Code contained an often-ignored note about advertising imagery, but he wrote an entirely new advertising screed in the style of the Ten Commandments that contained a set of twelve prohibitions. The first seven addressed imagery. They prohibited women in undergarments, women raising their skirts, suggestive poses, kissing, necking, and other suggestive material. The last five concerned advertising copy and prohibited misrepresentation of the film's contents, "salacious copy", and the word "courtesan".

Studios found their way around the restrictions and published increasingly racy imagery. Ultimately this backfired in 1934 when a billboard in Philadelphia was placed outside the home of Cardinal Dennis Dougherty. Severely offended, Dougherty took his revenge by helping to launch the motion-picture boycott that would later facilitate enforcement of the Code. A commonly repeated theme by those supporting censorship, and one mentioned in the Code itself was the notion that the common people needed to be saved from themselves by the more refined cultural elite.

Despite the obvious attempts to appeal to heterosexual American males, most of the patrons of sex pictures were women. Variety squarely blamed women for the increase in vice pictures:

Women are responsible for the ever-increasing public taste in sensationalism and sexy stuff. Women who make up the bulk of the picture audiences are also the majority reader of the tabloids, scandal sheets, flashy magazines, and erotic books ... the mind of the average man seems wholesome in comparison. ... Women love dirt, nothing shocks 'em.

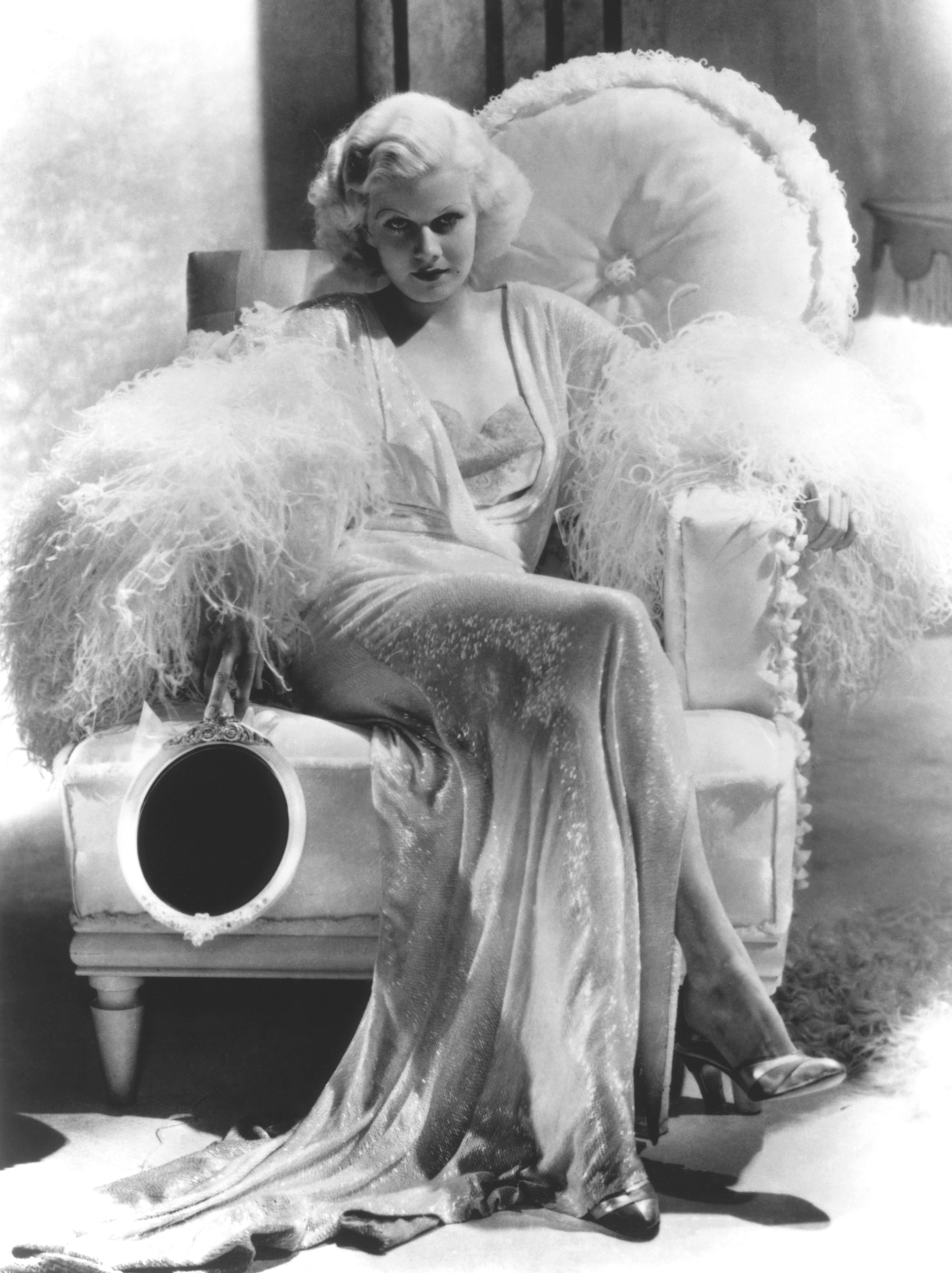
Jean Harlow (seen here in a 1933 still for Dinner at Eight) was propelled to stardom in pre-Code films such as Platinum Blonde, Red Dust, and Red-Headed Woman.

Pre-Code female audiences liked to indulge in the carnal lifestyles of mistresses and adulteresses while at the same time taking joy in their usually inevitable downfall in the closing scenes of the picture. While gangster films were claimed to corrupt the morals of young boys, vice films were blamed for threatening the purity of adolescent women.

=== Content ===
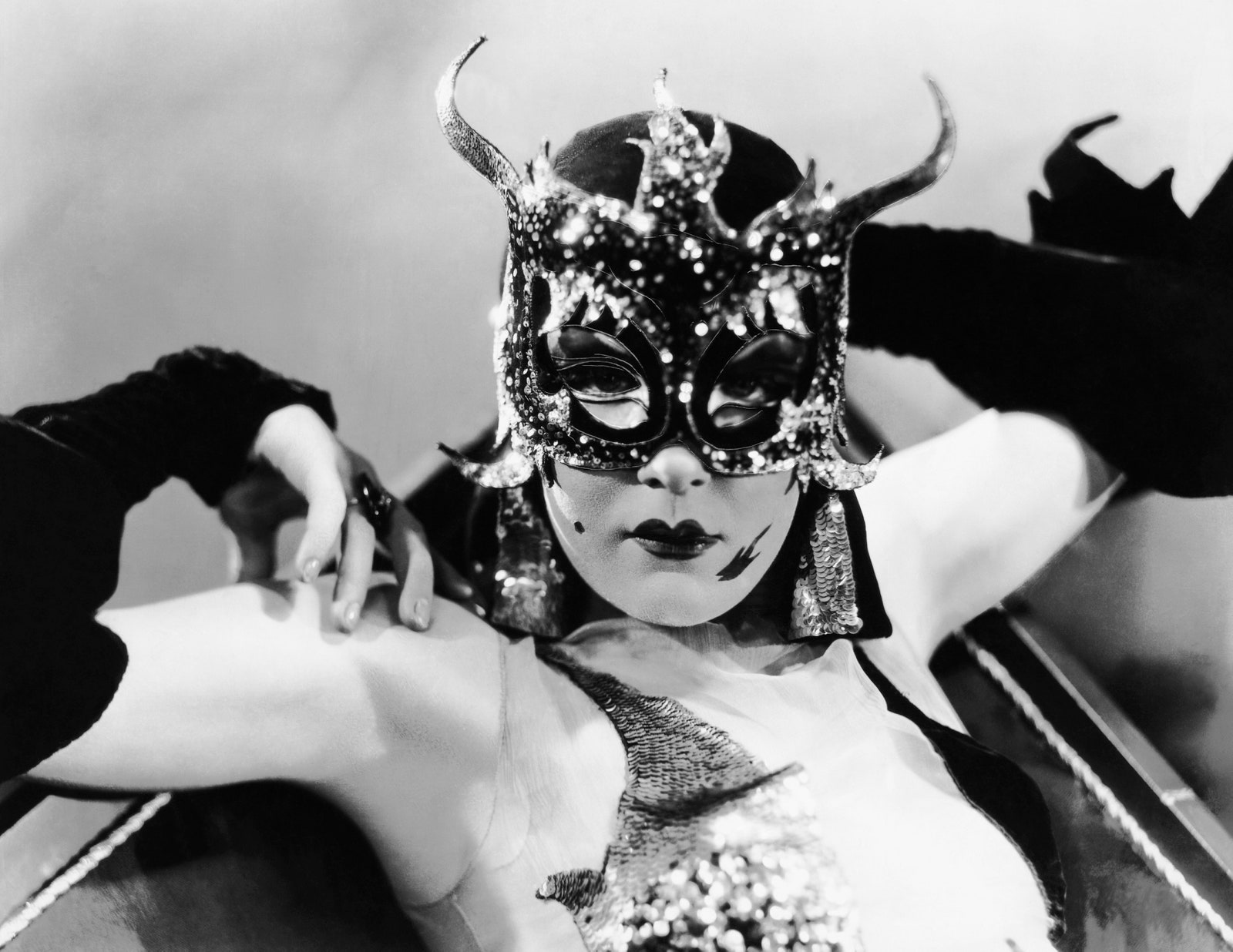
Kay Johnson in Madam Satan (1930), directed by Cecil B. DeMille

In pre-Code Hollywood, the sex film became synonymous with women's pictures—Darryl F. Zanuck once told Wingate that he was ordered by Warner Bros.' New York corporate office to reserve 20% of the studio's output for "women's pictures, which inevitably means sex pictures". Vice films typically tacked on endings where the most sin-filled characters were either punished or redeemed. Films explored Code-defying subjects in an unapologetic manner with the premise that an end-reel moment could redeem all that had gone before. The concept of marriage was often tested in films such as The Prodigal (1931), in which a woman is having an affair with a seedy character, and later falls in love with her brother-in-law. When her mother-in-law steps in at the end of the film, it is to encourage one son to grant his wife a divorce so she can marry his brother, with whom she is obviously in love. The older woman proclaims the message of the film in a line near the end: "This is the twentieth century. Go out into the world and get what happiness you can."

In Madame Satan (1930), adultery is explicitly condoned and used as a sign for a wife that she needs to act in a more enticing way to maintain her husband's interest. In Secrets (1933), a husband admits to serial adultery, only this time he repents and the marriage is saved. The films took aim at what was already a damaged institution. During the Great Depression, relations between spouses often deteriorated due to financial strain, marriages lessened, and husbands abandoned their families in increased numbers. Marriage rates continually declined in the early 1930s, finally rising in 1934, the final year of the pre-Code era, and although divorce rates lowered, this is likely because desertion became a more common method of separation. Consequently, female characters, such as Ruth Chatterton's in Female, live promiscuous bachelorette lifestyles, and control their own financial destiny (Chatterton supervises an auto factory) without regret.

In The Divorcee (1930), starring Norma Shearer, a wife discovers that her husband (played by Chester Morris) has been cheating on her. In reaction, she has an affair with his best friend (played by Robert Montgomery). When the husband finds out, he decides to leave her. After pleading with him to stay, the wife unleashes her frustrations upon him, and, in a moment of inspiration, reveals her desire to live a fearless, sexually liberated life without him. According to film critic Mick LaSalle, this was the motion picture that inspired other films centering upon sophisticated female protagonists, who stayed out late, had affairs, wore revealing gowns, and who basically destroyed the sexual double standard by asserting themselves both within society and in the bedroom. From The Divorcee onward, there developed "a trend toward a sophistication in women's pictures that would continue unabated until the end of the Pre-Code era in mid-1934".

One of the most prominent examples of punishment for immoral transgressions in vice film can be seen in The Story of Temple Drake, based on the William Faulkner novel Sanctuary. In Drake, the title character (played by Miriam Hopkins), a cold, vapid "party girl", the daughter of a judge, is raped and forced into prostitution by a backwoods character, and according to pre-Code scholar Thomas Doherty, the film implies that the deeds done to her are in recompense for her immorality. Later, in court, she confesses that she killed the man who raped and kept her. She faints after this confession, upon which her lawyer carries her out, leading to a "happy ending". In the RKO film Christopher Strong, Katharine Hepburn plays an aviator who becomes pregnant from an affair with a married man. She commits suicide by flying her plane directly upwards until she breaks the world altitude record, at which point she takes off her oxygen mask and plummets to earth. Strong female characters often ended films as "reformed" women, after experiencing situations in which their progressive outlook proved faulty.

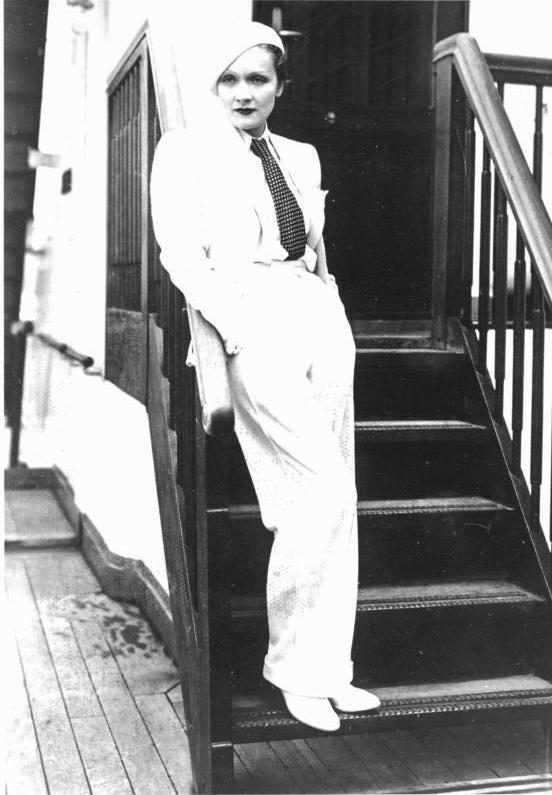
Marlene Dietrich's open bisexuality caused an uproar. In 1933 her studio, Paramount, signed a largely ineffectual agreement not to depict women in men's clothes in their films.

Female protagonists in aggressively sexual vice films were usually of two general kinds: the bad girl or the fallen woman. In so-called bad-girl pictures, female characters profited from promiscuity and immoral behavior. Jean Harlow frequently played bad-girl characters and dubbed them "sex vultures".

Two of the most prominent bad-girl films, Red-Headed Woman and Baby Face, featured Harlow and Stanwyck. In Red-Headed Woman, Harlow plays a secretary determined to sleep her way into a more luxurious lifestyle, and in Baby Face Stanwyck is an abused runaway determined to use sex to advance herself financially.

In Baby Face Stanwyck moves to New York and sleeps her way to the top of Gotham Trust. Her progress is illustrated in a recurring visual metaphor of the movie camera panning ever upward along the front of Gotham Trust's skyscraper. Men are driven mad with lust over her and they commit murder, attempt suicide, and are ruined financially for associating with her before she mends her ways in the final reel. Stanwyck's sole companion for the duration of the film is a black woman named Chico (Theresa Harris), whom she took with her when she ran away from home at age 14.

Red-Headed Woman begins with Harlow seducing her boss Bill LeGendre and intentionally breaking up his marriage. During her seductions, he tries to resist and slaps her, at which point she looks at him deliriously and says "Do it again. I like it! Do it again!" They eventually marry but Harlow seduces a wealthy aged industrialist who is in business with her husband so that she can move to New York. Although this plan succeeds, she is cast aside when she is discovered having an affair with her chauffeur, in essence cheating on her paramour. Harlow shoots LeGendre, nearly killing him. When she is last seen in the film, she is in France in the back seat of a limousine with an elderly wealthy gentleman being driven along by the same chauffeur. The film was a boon to Harlow's career and has been described as a "trash masterpiece".

Cinema classified as "fallen woman" films was often inspired by real-life hardships women endured in the early Depression era workplace. The men in power in these stories frequently sexually harassed the women working for them. Remaining employed often became a question of a woman's virtue. In She Had to Say Yes (1933), starring Loretta Young, a struggling department store offers dates with its female stenographers as an incentive to customers. Employees' Entrance was marketed with the tag line "See what out of work girls are up against these days." Joy complained in 1932 of another genre, the "kept woman" film, which presented adultery as an alternative to the tedium of an unhappy marriage.

Nudity was generally banned, but permitted if it was presented as documentary footage from other cultures. Filmmaker Deane Dickason took advantage of this loophole to release a documentary titled Virgins of Bali in September 1932, which concerns a day in the life of two Balinese teenagers who are topless in much of the footage. The film's introduction notes that Balinese women were normally topless and only covered their breasts for ceremonial duties; Doherty commented dryly that, "fortunately" for Dickason, his film's two "stars" rarely performed ceremonial duties. Typical of the film is the first scene where the two girls take a bath in the river while Dickason narrates, talking breathlessly about how the two girls "bathe their shamelessly nude bronze bodies". Virgins of Bali, which consisted almost entirely of scenes of Balinese women in various states of undress under the guise of showing what daily life in Bali was like, was a successful film with men at the time and contributed to Bali becoming a popular tourist destination.

Queer people were portrayed in such pre-Code films as Our Betters (1933), Footlight Parade (1933), Only Yesterday (1933), Sailor's Luck (1933), and Cavalcade (1933). Although the topic was dealt with much more openly than in the decades that followed, the characterizations of queer characters were usually derogatory. Gay male characters were portrayed as flighty with high voices, existing merely as buffoonish supporting characters.

A rare example of a homosexual character not being portrayed in the standard effeminate way, albeit still negatively, was the villain "Murder Legendre", played by Bela Lugosi in White Zombie (1932), the Frenchman who mastered the magical powers of a bokor (voodoo sorcerer). Legendre is hired by a wealthy plantation owner, Charles Beaumont (Robert Frazer), to turn the woman he desires into a zombie, only to be informed later that Legendre desires him and is going to transform him into a zombie. In films like Ladies They Talk About, lesbians were portrayed as rough, burly characters, but in DeMille's The Sign of the Cross, a female Christian slave is brought to a Roman prefect and seduced in dance by a statuesque lesbian dancer. Fox nearly became the first American studio to use the word "gay" to refer to homosexuality in their 1933 release My Weakness, but the SRC made the studio muffle the word in the soundtrack of all footage that reached theaters.

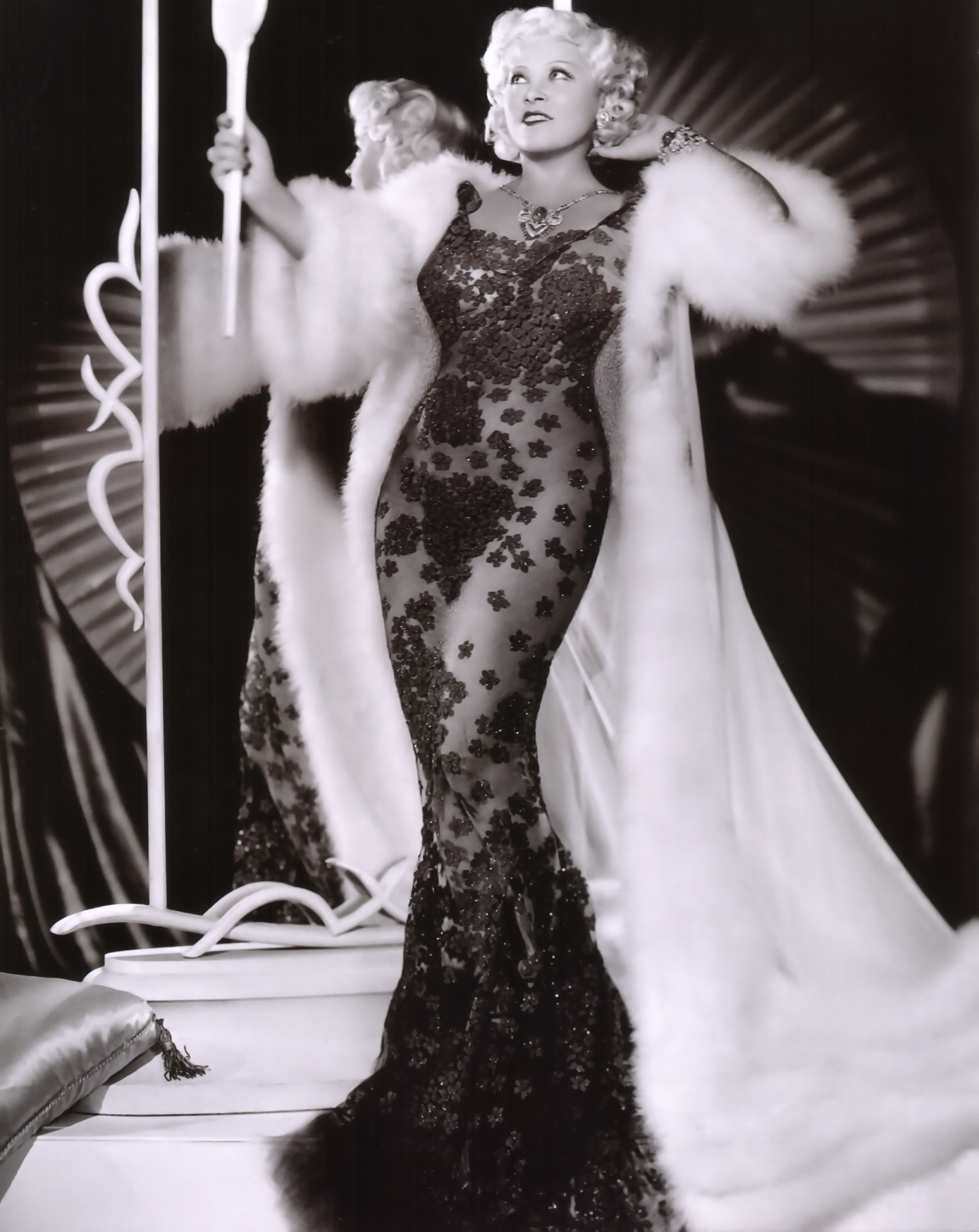
Mae West is sometimes erroneously called the reason for the Production Code. Even under the Code she managed to wear an almost transparent dress in Go West, Young Man (1936).

Bisexual actress Marlene Dietrich cultivated a cross-gender fan base and started a trend when she began wearing men's suits. She caused a commotion when she appeared at the premiere of The Sign of the Cross in 1932 in a tuxedo, complete with top hat and cane. The appearance of homosexual characters was at its height in 1933; in that year, Hays declared that all gay male characters would be removed from pictures. Paramount took advantage of the negative publicity Dietrich generated by signing a largely meaningless agreement stating that they would not portray women in male attire.

== Comedy films ==
In the harsh economic times of the early Depression, films and performers often featured an alienated, cynical, and socially dangerous comic style. As with political films, comedy softened with the election of FDR and the optimism of the New Deal. Characters in the pre-Code era frequently engaged in comedic duels of escalating sexual innuendo. In Employee's Entrance, a woman enters the office of a scoundrel boss who remarks, "Oh, it's you—I didn't recognize you with all your clothes on." Racial stereotypes were usually employed when ethnic characters appeared. Black people in particular were usually the butt of the wisecrack, never the wisecracker. The most acknowledged black comedian was Stepin Fetchit, whose slow-witted comedic character was only meant to be successful in an unintentional manner, with himself as the punchline.

The New York stage was filled with ribald humor and sexually offensive comedy; when movie producers started to put wisecracks in their sound pictures, they sought New York performers. Popular comics such as the Marx Brothers got their start on Broadway in front of live audiences. Censors complained when they had to keep up with the deluge of jokes in pictures in the early 1930s, some of which were designed to go over their heads. The comic banter of some early sound films was rapid-fire, non-stop, and frequently exhausting for the audience by the final reel.

Mae West had already established herself as a comedic performer when her 1926 Broadway show Sex made national headlines. Tried and convicted of indecency by the New York City District Attorney, she served eight days in prison. West carefully constructed a stage persona and carried it over into her interviews and personal appearances. Despite her voluptuous physique, most of her appeal lay in her suggestive manner. She became a wordsmith in the art of the come-on and the seductive line, and despite her obvious appeal to male audiences, was popular with women as well. Over the cries of the censors, West got her start in the film Night After Night (1932), which starred George Raft and Constance Cummings, as a Texas Guinan-esque supporting character. She agreed to appear in the film only after producers agreed to let her write her own lines. In West's first line on film, after a hat check girl remarks "Goodness, what beautiful diamonds", West replies, "Goodness had nothing to do with it, dearie." Raft, who had wanted Texas Guinan herself for the role that went to West, later wrote, "In this picture, Mae West stole everything but the cameras." She went on to make She Done Him Wrong in 1933, which became a huge box office hit, grossing $3 million against a $200,000 budget, and nine months later wrote and starred in I'm No Angel. She became such a success that her career saved Paramount from financial ruin.

The arrival of sound film created a new job market for writers of screen dialogue. Many newspaper journalists moved to California and became studio-employed screenwriters. This resulted in a series of fast-talking comedy movies featuring newsmen. The Front Page, later re-made as the much less cynical and more sentimental post-Code His Girl Friday (1940), was adapted from the Broadway play by Chicago newsmen, and Hollywood screenwriters, Ben Hecht and Charles MacArthur. It was based on Hecht's experiences working as a reporter for the Chicago Daily Journal.

=== Romantic comedy films ===
Prior to the strict enforcement of the Production Code, romantic comedies portrayed female characters with characteristics such as independence, ambition, and sexuality. In many pre-Code Hollywood films, female characters were empowered and in narrative-driving roles, where they made their own personal and romantic decisions that drove the plot of the film.

The Production Code stated that "The sanctity of the institution of marriage and the home shall be upheld. Pictures shall not infer that low forms of sex relationships are the accepted or common thing." The code aimed to promote morality and traditional values which significantly restricted how women, relationships, and sexuality could be depicted in film. "These men came up with thirty-six rules for things that should be rarely shown or not shown at all in a film, many of which governed the representation of women, including: Pointed profanity; Any licentious or suggestive nudity—in fact or in silhouette; Any inference of sex perversion; Sex hygiene and venereal disease." The Production Code also had a list of warnings that targeted female characters, such as, "The sale of women, or of a woman selling her virtue; First-night scenes; Man and woman in bed together; Deliberate seduction of girls; The institution of marriage; Excessive or lustful kissing."

The 1933 film Baby Face was directly impacted by the enforcement of the Production Code. This pre-Code Hollywood film portrays a former prostitute, Lily, who uses her looks and sexuality to rise to the top in her new job at a bank. She shows ambition and independent thinking. Following the implementation of the Code, Baby Face was heavily censored, cutting many sexually suggestive scenes and changing dialogue that encouraged promiscuous behavior.

=== Cartoons ===
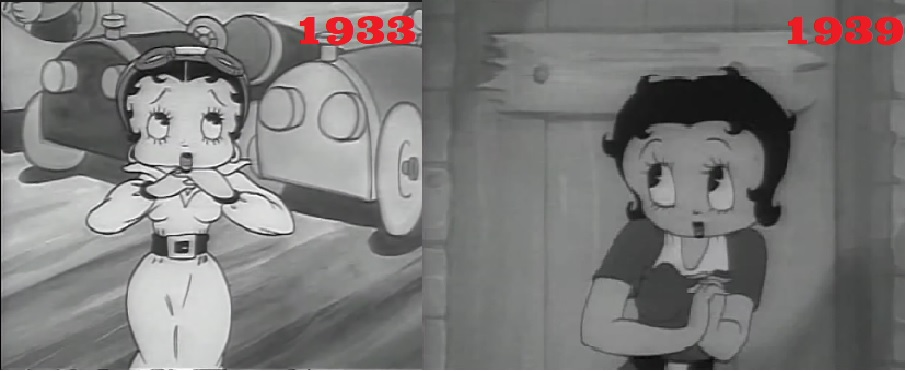
Betty Boop in 1933 and 1939

Theatrical cartoons were also covered by the Production Code. According to Leonard Maltin: "In early 1933 a Georgia theater owner wrote to Film Daily: 'The worst kicks we have are on smut in cartoons. They are primarily a kid draw, and parents frequently object to the filth that is put in them, incidentally without helping the comedy. The dirtiest ones are invariably the least funny.'" Betty Boop thus underwent some of the most dramatic changes after the Code was imposed: "gone was the garter, the short skirt, the décolletage".

== Musical films ==
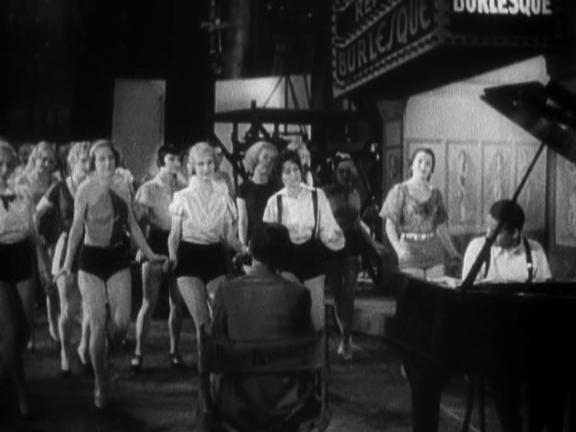
Dancers rehearsing in abbreviated clothing in 42nd Street (1933) illustrates the allure of the backstage musical.

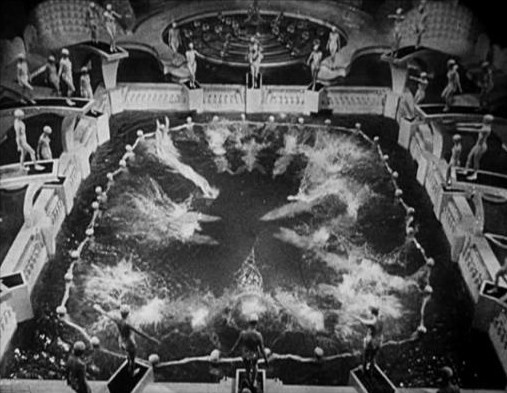
The "By a Waterfall" number from Busby Berkeley's Footlight Parade (1933), which also highlighted James Cagney's dancing talents

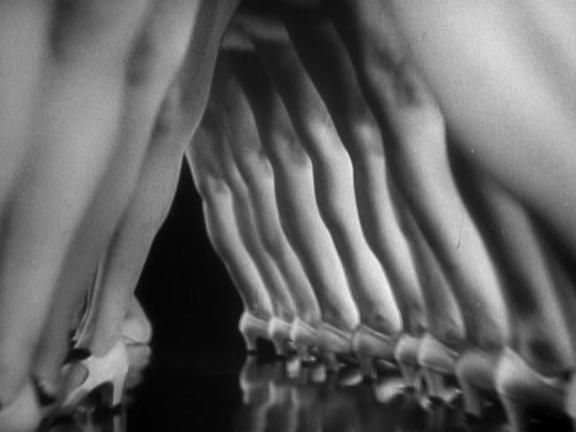
42nd Street (1933) made concessions to the Hays Code in its dialogue, but still featured sexualized imagery.

As sound-pictures became the norm in Hollywood, the "backstage" film musical was a natural subject for the new medium. Not only could the studios present singing and dancing to their audiences – many of whom were unlikely to have ever seen a stage musical – but the pre-Code film musicals also tended to feature shapely young female chorus "girls" wearing skimpy rehearsal clothing that revealed parts of the body that were still not normal to see on the street, and hinted at other parts in a way that normal fashion did not allow. But even if this could be considered exploitative use of the female body, the pre-Code movie musicals were generally not derogatory in their presentation of women's physical virtues, but celebratory, with Busby Berkeley's spectacular musical numbers being especially, and wittily, so; Berkeley avoided fetishizing his female performers.

== Horror and science fiction films ==
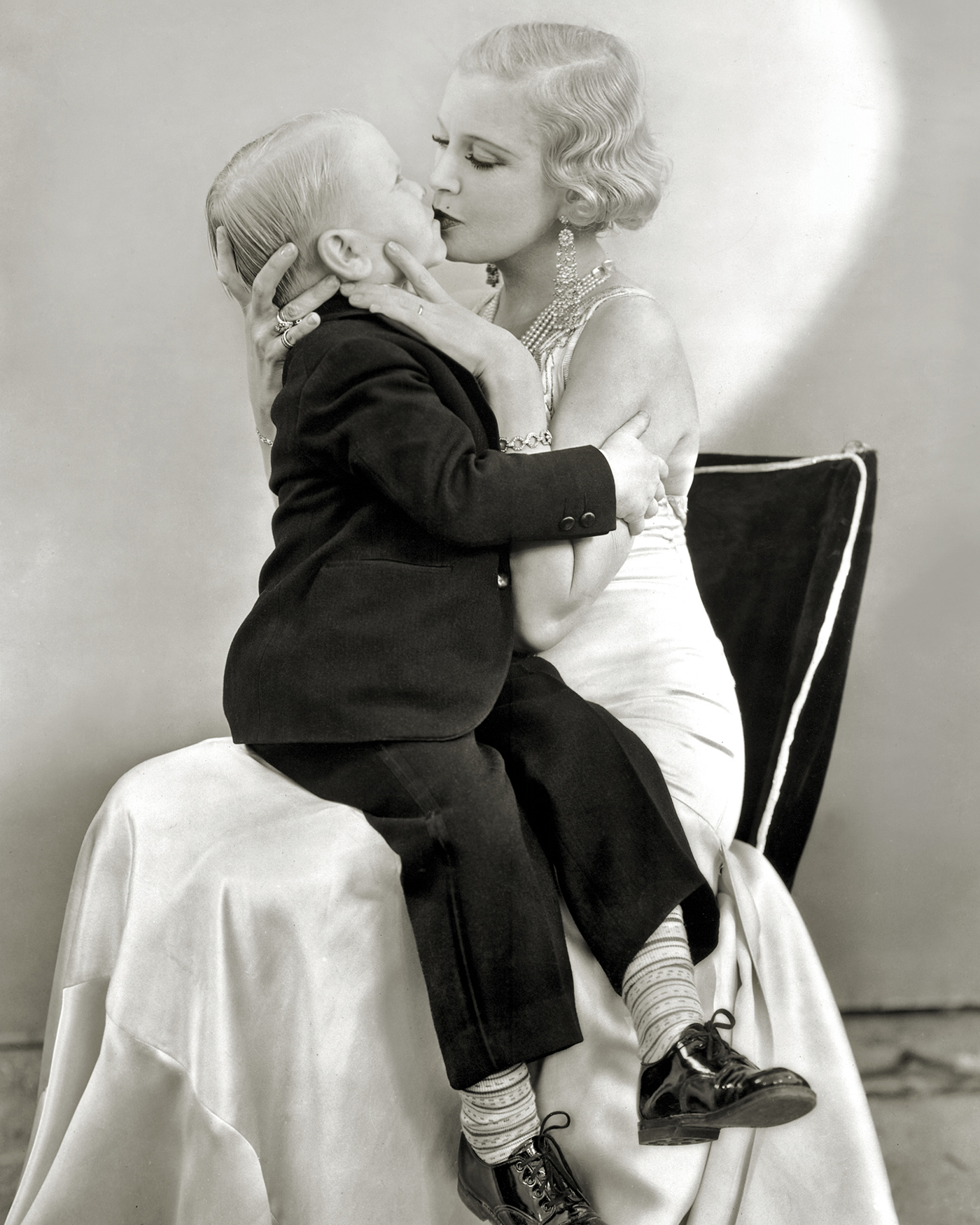
Harry Earles of The Doll Family and Olga Baclanova in the controversial Freaks (1932)

Unlike silent-era sex and crime films, silent horror movies, despite being produced in the hundreds, were never a major concern for censors or civic leaders. When sound horror films were released, however, they quickly caused controversy. Sound provided "atmospheric music and sound effects, creepy-voiced macabre dialogue and a liberal dose of blood-curdling screams", which intensified its effects on audiences, and consequently on moral crusaders. The Hays Code did not mention gruesomeness, and filmmakers took advantage of this oversight. However, state boards usually had no set guidelines and could object to any material they found indecent. Although films such as Frankenstein and Freaks caused controversy when they were released, they had already been re-cut to comply with censors.

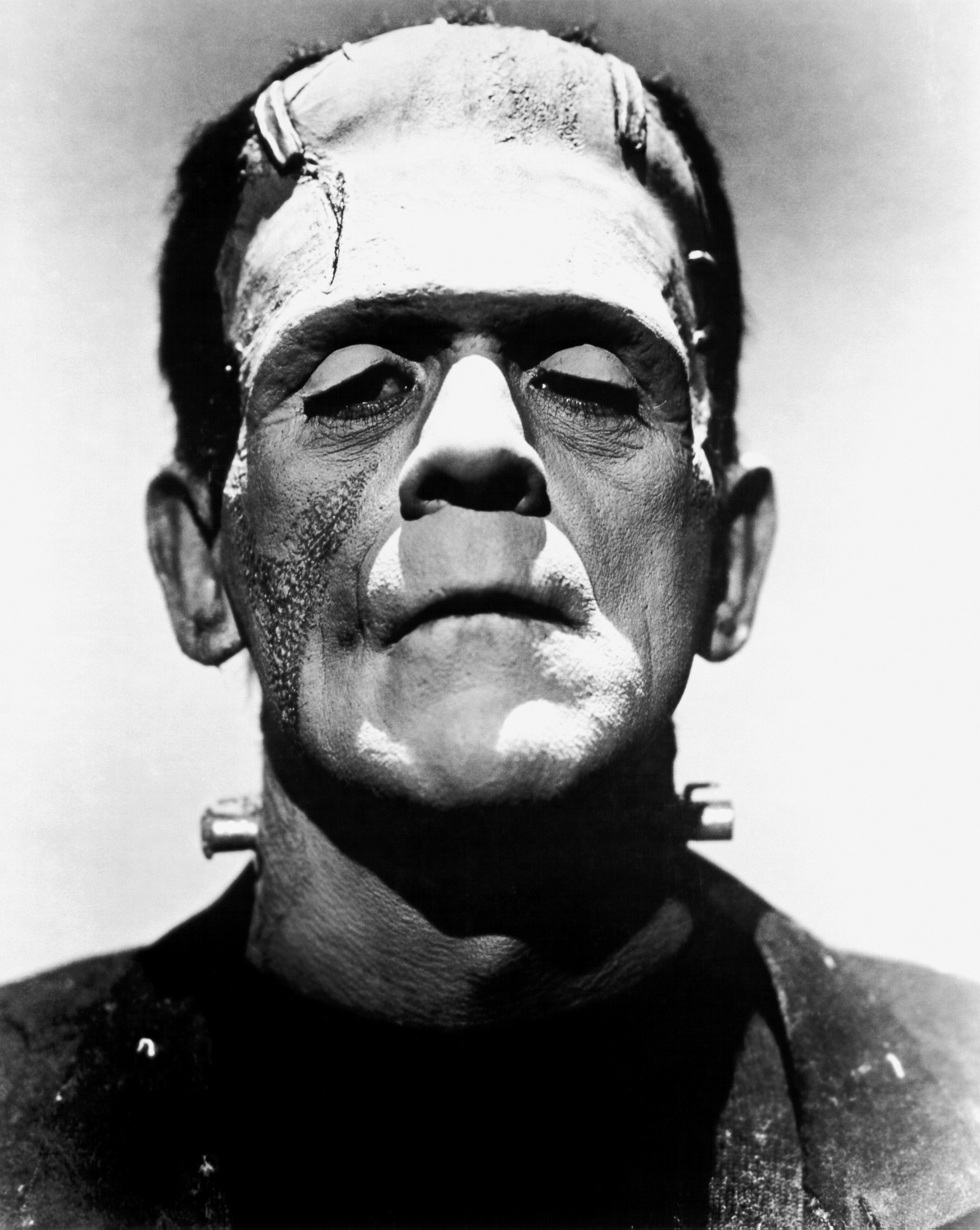
Boris Karloff in Frankenstein (1931). The monster's brutality shocked many moviegoers, as did the doctor's declaration that "Now I know what it feels like to be God!" By the time of Bride of Frankenstein (1935), the Code was in full effect.

Comprising the nascent motion picture genres of horror and science fiction, the "nightmare picture" provoked individual psychological terror in its horror incarnations, while embodying group sociological terror in its science fiction manifestations. The two main types of pre-Code horror movies were the single monster movie, and films where masses of hideous beasts rose up and attacked their putative betters. Frankenstein and Freaks exemplified both genres.

The pre-Code horror cycle was motivated by financial necessity. Universal in particular buoyed itself with the production of horror hits such as Dracula (1931) and Frankenstein, then followed those successes up with Murders in the Rue Morgue (1932), The Mummy (1932), and The Old Dark House (1932). Other major studios responded with their own productions. Much like the crime film cycle, however, the intense boom of the horror cycle was ephemeral, and had fallen off at the box office by the end of the pre-Code era.

While Joy declared Dracula "quite satisfactory from the standpoint of the Code" before it was released, and the film had little trouble reaching theaters, Frankenstein was a different story. New York, Pennsylvania, and Massachusetts removed the scene where the monster unintentionally drowns a little girl and lines that referenced Dr. Frankenstein's God complex. Kansas, in particular, objected to the film. The state's censor board requested the cutting of 32 scenes, which if removed, would have halved the length of the film.

Paramount's Dr. Jekyll and Mr. Hyde (1931) played to the Freudian theories popular with the audience of its time. Fredric March played the split-personality title character. Jekyll represented the composed super-ego, and Hyde the lecherous id. Miriam Hopkins's coquettish bar singer, Ivy Pierson, sexually teases Jekyll early in the film by displaying parts of her legs and bosom. Joy felt the scene had been "dragged in simply to titillate the audience". Hyde coerces her with the threat of violence into becoming his paramour and beats her when she attempts to stop seeing him. She is contrasted with his wholesome fiancée Muriel (Rose Hobart), whose chaste nature dissatisfies March's baser alter ego. The film is considered the "most honored of the Pre-Code horror films". Many of the graphic scenes between Hyde and Ivy were cut by local censors because of their suggestiveness. Sex was intimately tied to horror in many pre-Code horror movies. In Murders in the Rue Morgue, an adaptation of Edgar Allan Poe's classic tale that has little in common with the source material, Bela Lugosi plays a mad scientist who tortures and kills women, trying to mix human blood with ape blood during his experiments. His prized experiment, an intelligent ape named Erik, breaks into a woman's second-floor apartment window and rapes her.

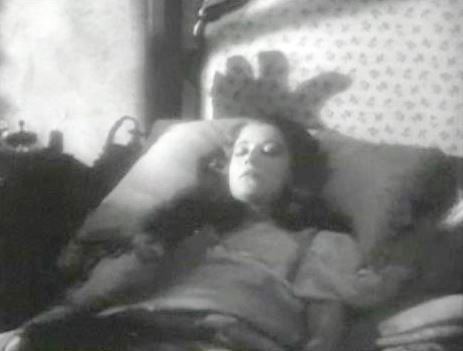
In Murders in the Rue Morgue (1932), the shadow of the ape's hand appears over head of Camille (Sidney Fox) as it enters her room. What follows has been dubbed "interspecies miscegenation" by film historian Thomas Doherty.

In Freaks, director Tod Browning of Dracula fame helms a film that depicts a traveling circus populated by a group of carnival "freaks". Browning cast actual carnival sideshow performers, including people with dwarfism, an intersex person, conjoined twins, and "the armless and legless man billed as the 'living torso'". Although circus freak shows were common in the early 1930s, the film was their first depiction on screen. The film includes scenes of the disabled characters performing mundane tasks, including one of the "living torso" lighting a match and then a cigarette with his mouth. The film was accompanied by a sensational marketing campaign that asked sexually suggestive questions such as "Do the Siamese Twins make love?", "What sex is the half-man half-woman?", and "Can a full grown woman truly love a midget?" In response to negative test screenings, studio Metro-Goldwyn-Mayer cut the film from its original 90 minutes to just over one hour. Surprisingly, given its reaction to Frankenstein, the state of Kansas objected to nothing in Freaks. However, other states, such as Georgia, were repulsed by the film and it was not shown in many locales. The film later became a cult classic spurred by midnight movie showings, but it was a box-office bomb in its original release.

In Island of Lost Souls (1932), an adaptation of H. G. Wells' science-fiction novel The Island of Doctor Moreau, Charles Laughton plays yet another mad scientist with a God complex. As Moreau, Laughton creates a mad scientist's island paradise, an unmonitored haven where he is free to create a race of man-beasts and Lota, a beast-woman he wants to mate with a normal human male. A castaway lands on his island, providing him an opportunity to see how far his science experiment, the barely clothed, attractive Lota, has come. The castaway discovers Moreau vivisecting one of the beast-men and attempts to leave the island. He runs into the camp of the man-beasts and Moreau beats them back with a whip. The film ends with Lota dead, the castaway rescued, and the man-beasts chanting, "Are we not men?" as they attack and then vivisect Moreau. The film has been described as "a rich man's Freaks" due to its esteemed source material. Wells, however, despised the movie for its lurid excesses. It was rejected by 14 local censor boards in the United States, and considered "against nature" in Great Britain, where it was banned until 1958.

== Exotic adventure films ==
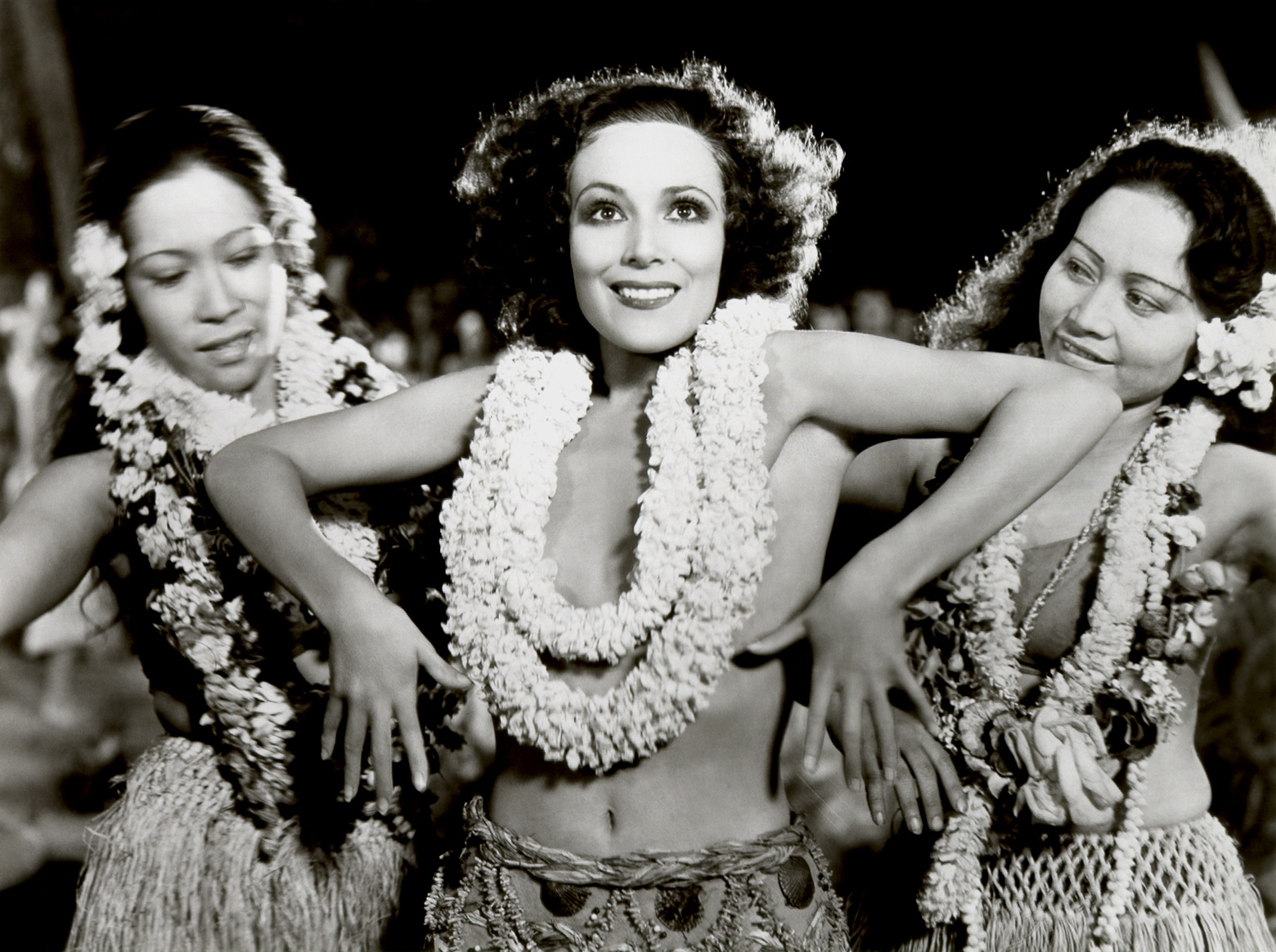
Dolores del Río dances almost topless in Bird of Paradise (1932).

In the early 1930s, the studios made a series of films that aimed to provide viewers a sense of the exotic, an exploration of the unknown and the forbidden. Films such as Africa Speaks were directly marketed by referencing interracial sex; moviegoers received small packets labeled "Secrets", which contained pictures of naked black women. As portrayals of historic conditions, these movies are of little educational value, but as artifacts that show Hollywood's attitude towards race and foreign cultures, they are enlightening. The lack of black characters in films highlights their status in Jim Crow America.

The central point of interest in The Blonde Captive (1931), a film that depicted a blonde woman abducted by a savage tribe of Aboriginal Australians, was not that she was kidnapped, but that she enjoys living among the tribe. In Bird of Paradise (1932), a White American man (Joel McCrea) enjoys a torrid affair with a Polynesian princess (Dolores del Río). The film created a scandal when released due to a scene featuring del Río swimming naked. Orson Welles said del Río represented the highest erotic ideal with her performance in the film.

The white protagonist in Tarzan, the Ape Man (1932) is the "King of the [African] Jungle". Tarzan (Johnny Weissmuller) is a monosyllabic half-naked jungle creature whose attractiveness is derived from his physical prowess; throughout the movie, he saves Jane (Maureen O'Sullivan) from danger and she swoons in his arms. When Jane's father warns her "[h]e's not like us", she responds, "[h]e's white" as evidence to the contrary. In the racy 1934 sequel, Tarzan and His Mate (the last word meaning both a status and a biological function), men come from the U.S. with fancy gowns and other accoutrements to woo and clothe the bra-less, barely clothed Jane, again played by O'Sullivan, hoping to lure her away from the savage Tarzan. He detests the fancier clothing and tears it off. The film included a skinny-dipping scene with extensive nudity with a body double standing in for O'Sullivan. Breen, then head of the SRC, objected to the scene, and MGM, the movie's producer, took their case to the appeals review board. The board consisted of the heads of Fox, RKO, and Universal. After watching the scene "several times", the board sided with Breen and the MPPDA, and the scene was removed, but MGM still allowed some uncut trailers and a few reels to stay in circulation. MGM marketed the film primarily towards women using taglines such as:

Girls! Would you live like Eve if you found the right Adam?
Modern marriages could learn plenty from this drama of primitive jungle mating!
If all marriages were based on the primitive mating instinct, it would be a better world.

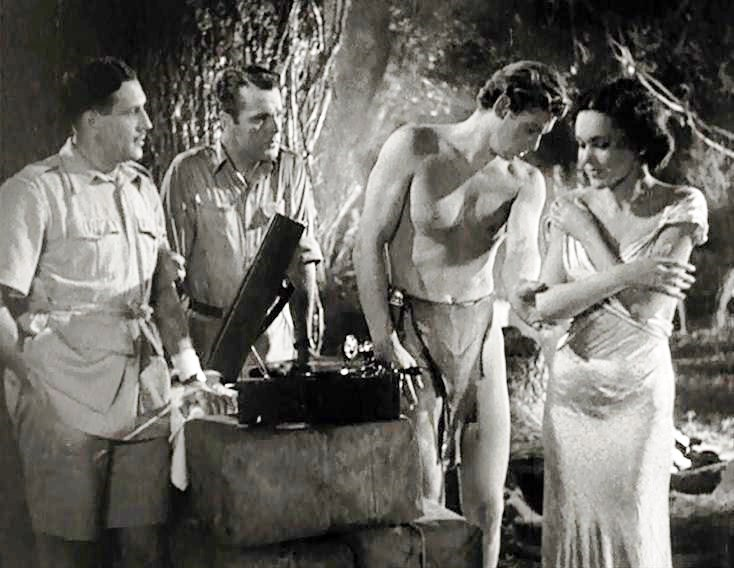
Tarzan and His Mate (1934)

Non-White characters were portrayed against stereotype in Massacre (1934). The protagonist (Richard Barthelmess) is a Native American who performs in a Wild West Show in full Indian garb, but then slips into a suit and speaks in American slang once the show is over. He has a black butler who plays dumb by slipping into a stereotypical slow-witted "negro" character when it suits him.

Films such as The Mask of Fu Manchu (1932), Shanghai Express (1932) and The Bitter Tea of General Yen (1933) explored the exoticism of the Far East—by using white actors, not Asians, in the lead roles. The white actors frequently looked absurd in yellow-face makeup next to genuine Asians, so the studios would cast all the Asian parts white. Generally, "Yellow Peril" stereotypes dominated the portrayal of Asian characters, who were almost always villains. The American scholar Huang Yunte wrote that the character of Charlie Chan, a Chinese American detective aided by his bumbling, Americanized "Number One Son" were virtually the only positive examples of Asian characters in Hollywood in this period. The actress Anna May Wong complained in a 1933 interview about the prevalence of "Yellow Peril" stereotypes in Hollywood, saying: "Why is it that the screen Chinese is always the villain? And so crude a villain – murderous, treacherous, a snake in the grass! We are not like that. How could we be, with a civilization that is so many times older than the West?"

In Fu Manchu, Boris Karloff plays the evil Chinese mad scientist and gangster Dr. Fu Manchu, who wants to find the sword and mask of Genghis Khan, which will give him the power to control the "countless hordes" of Asians, and lead them into battle against the West. Fu is a sexual deviant who engages in ritual torture and has occult powers. Several times, the film seems to suggest Fu is engaged in an incestuous relationship with his equally evil daughter Fah Lo See (Myrna Loy), which plays up a central theme of the "Yellow Peril" fears, the alleged abnormal sexuality of Asians. In a scene cut from the film due to its depiction of miscegenation, the film shows Fu's depraved daughter violating one of the chaste good characters. Fu is eventually conquered, but not before he temporarily lays his hand on the sword and proclaims to a vast Pan-Asian army made up of Asians and Muslims: "Would you have maidens like this [referring to Karen Morley] for your wives? Then conquer and breed! Kill the white man and take his women!"

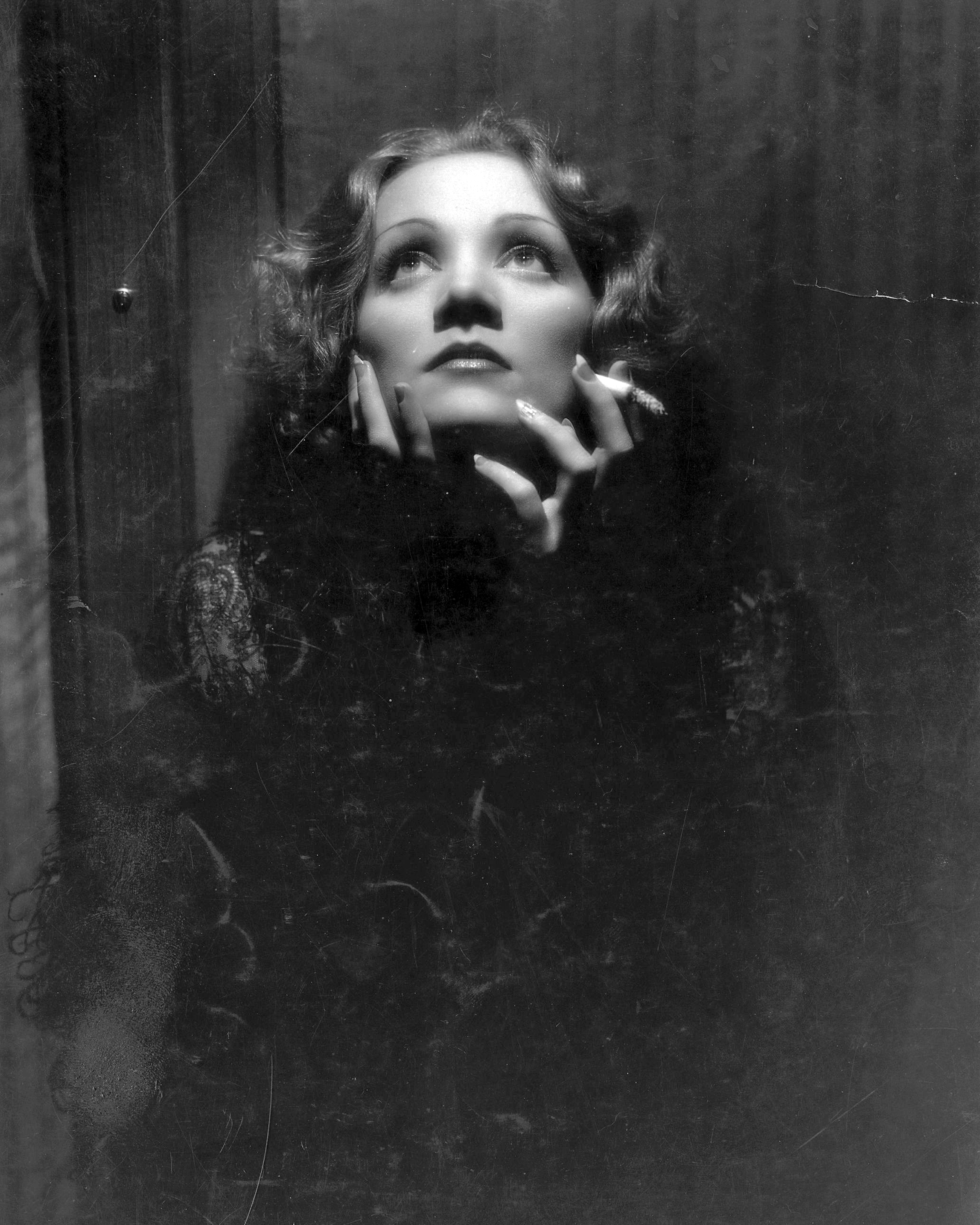
Marlene Dietrich in Shanghai Express (1932)

In Frank Capra's The Bitter Tea of General Yen, Stanwyck plays a missionary who goes to civil-war-torn China and meets the titular general (played by Nils Asther) after his car kills the driver of her rickshaw. When she is knocked unconscious in a riot, he takes her out of the rabble and onto a train car. She has lurid, horror-themed, symbolic dreams about the General, in which she is both titillated and repulsed by him. The film breaks precedent by developing into an interracial love story, but his army ends in ruins. Yen kills himself at the film's conclusion—by drinking poisoned tea—rather than be captured and killed. Capra adored the script and disregarded the risk of making a film that broke California's (and 29 other states') laws concerning the portrayal of miscegenation. Cinematographer Joseph Walker tested a new technique he created, which he dubbed "Variable Diffusion", in filming the movie. This rendered the entire film in very soft focus.

== Documentary films ==
From 1904 until 1967, when television finally killed them off, newsreels preceded films. In the early sound-film era, they lasted around eight minutes and featured highlights and clips of the world's biggest stories. Updated twice a week by the five major studios, they became a highly profitable enterprise: in 1933, newsreels had a total box office take of almost $19.5 million against an outlay of under $10 million. The sound-film era created the narrator; among the first was Graham McNamee, who provided voiceover during the clips, often delivering hackneyed jokes while delineating the on-screen action. Sound newsreel interviews and monologs featured famous subjects unaccustomed to the new medium. These clips changed public perception of important historical figures depending on their elocution, the sound of their previously unheard voices, and their composure in front of the camera. Around 12 "newsreel theaters" were soon created around the United States, the most successful being the Embassy Newsreel Theater on Broadway. The Embassy was a 578-seat facility that presented fourteen 45–50 minute programs a day, running from 10 in the morning until midnight. It was noted for its discerning, intellectual audience, many of whom did not attend motion-picture theaters.

All Quiet on the Western Front (1930), one of the first American films to portray the horrors of World War I, received great praise from the public for its humanitarian, anti-war message.

The most gripping news story of the pre-Code era was the kidnapping of the Lindbergh baby on the evening of March 1, 1932. As the child was already enormously famous before the kidnapping, the event created a media circus, with news coverage more intense than anything since World War I. Newsreels featuring family photos of the child (the first time private pictures had been "conscripted for public service") asked spectators to report any sight of him. On May 12, 1932, the child's body was found less than five miles from the Lindbergh home. Although newsreels covered the most important topics of the day, they also presented human-interest stories (such as the immensely popular coverage of the Dionne quintuplets) and entertainment news, at times in greater detail than more pressing political and social matters.

Some of the images' impact belies their historical accuracy; nearly all ceremonies and public events that were filmed for newsreels in the early sound era were staged, and in some cases even reenacted. For instance: when FDR signed an important bill, a member of his cabinet was called away before the staged reenactment began, so the film shows him absent at the time of the signing, although he had been present. The newsreels of FDR were staged to hide his hobbled gait caused by polio. Caught between the desire to present accurate hard-hitting news stories and the need to keep an audience in the mood for the upcoming entertainment, newsreels often soft-pedaled the difficulties Americans faced during the early years of the Great Depression. FDR in particular received favorable treatment from Hollywood, with all five of the major studios producing pro-FDR shorts by late 1933. These shorts featured some of the studios' lesser contract talent extolling the virtues of FDR-created government and social programs. Roosevelt himself was a natural before the camera. The newsreels were instrumental to the success of his initial campaign, and his enduring popularity while in office. He was described by Variety as the "Barrymore of the Capital".

Taking advantage of 30 years of archived newsreels were filmmakers making early sound-era documentaries. World War I was a popular topic of these films and was the subject of numerous documentaries including The Big Drive (1933), World in Revolt (1933), This is America (1933), Hell's Holiday (1933), and the presciently titled The First World War (1934) – the most critically and commercially successful documentary of the era.

Filmmakers also made feature-length documentaries that covered the dark recesses of the globe, including the Amazon rainforest, Native American settlements, the Pacific Islands, and everywhere in between. Taking advantage of audiences' voyeuristic impulses, aided by the allowance of nudity in tribal documentaries, the filming of lands untouched by modernity, and the presentation of locales never before filmed, these movies placated Depression era American audiences by showing them lifestyles more difficult than their own. Also captured were polar expeditions in films such as 90° South and With Byrd at the South Pole, and sub-Saharan Africa in the safari films of Martin and Osa Johnson, among others.

Some exploitation-style documentaries purported to show actual events but were instead staged, elaborate ruses. The most prominent of these was Ingagi (1931), a film that claimed to show a ritual where African women were given over to gorillas as sex slaves, but instead was mostly filmed in Los Angeles using local African-Americans in place of natives. Douglas Fairbanks mocked the phoniness of many pre-Code documentaries in his parody Around the World in 80 Minutes with Douglas Fairbanks, in one scene of which he filmed himself wrestling a stuffed tiger doll, then a tiger-skin rug. Opposing these films was the travelogue, which was shown before features and served as a short saccharine form of cinematic tourism.

== Beginning of Code era ==
Pre-Code films began to draw the ire of various religious groups, some Protestant but mostly a contingent of Roman Catholic crusaders. Amleto Giovanni Cicognani, apostolic delegate to the Catholic Church in the United States, called upon Roman Catholics in the United States to unite against the surging immorality of films. As a result, in 1933, the Catholic Legion of Decency, headed by the Reverend John T. McNicholas (later renamed the National Legion of Decency), was established to control and enforce decency standards and boycott films they deemed offensive. They created a rating system for films that started at "harmless" and ended at "condemned", with the latter denoting a film that was a sin to watch.

I wish to join the Legion of Decency, which condemns vile and unwholesome moving pictures. I unite with all who protest against them as a grave menace to youth, to home life, to country and to religion. I condemn absolutely those salacious motion pictures which, with other degrading agencies, are corrupting public morals and promoting a sex mania in our land ... Considering these evils, I hereby promise to remain away from all motion pictures except those which do not offend decency and Christian morality.

— Catholic Legion of Decency Pledge

The Legion spurred several million Roman Catholics across the U.S. to sign up for the boycott, allowing local religious leaders to determine which films to protest.

Conservative Protestants tended to support much of the crackdown, particularly in the South, where anything relating to the state of race relations or miscegenation could not be portrayed. Although the Central Conference of American Rabbis joined in the protest, it was an uneasy alliance given the heavy presence of Jewish studio executives and producers, which, it was felt, had inspired at least some of the vitriol from the Catholic groups.

Hays opposed direct censorship, considering it "Un-American". He had stated that although there were some tasteless films in his estimation, working with filmmakers was better than direct oversight, and that, overall, films were not harmful to children. Hays blamed some of the more prurient films on the difficult economic times, which exerted "tremendous commercial pressure" on the studios more than a flouting of the code. Catholic groups became enraged with Hays and as early as July 1934 were demanding that he resign from his position, which he did not, although his influence waned and Breen took control, with Hays becoming a functionary.

The PCA seal of approval in the 1930s. The Seal appeared before every picture approved by the MPPDA.

The Payne Study and Experiment Fund was created in 1927 by Frances Payne Bolton to support a study of the influence of fiction on children. The Payne Fund Studies, a series of eight books published from 1933 to 1935 that detailed five years of research aimed specifically at the cinema's effects on children, were also gaining publicity at this time, and became a great concern to Hays. Hays had said certain films might alter "... that sacred thing, the mind of a child ... that clean, virgin thing, that unmarked state" and have "the same responsibility, the same care about the thing put on it that the best clergyman or the most inspired teacher would have". Despite its initial reception, the main findings of the study were largely innocuous. It found that cinema's effect on individuals varied with age and social position, and that films reinforced audiences' existing beliefs. The Motion Picture Research Council (MPRC, led by honorary vice president Sara Delano Roosevelt (mother of President Franklin D. Roosevelt), and executive director the Rev. William H. Short) which funded the study, was not pleased. An "alarmist summary" of the study's results written by Henry James Forman appeared in McCall's, a leading women's magazine of the time, and Forman's book, Our Movie Made Children, which became a bestseller, publicized the Payne Fund's results, emphasizing its more negative aspects.

The social environment created by the publicity of the Payne Fund Studies and religious protests reached such a fever pitch that a member of the Hays Office described it as a "state of war". However, several newspapers lambasted the studies. When discussing the Supreme Court's 1915 decision, film historian Gregory Black argues that the efforts of reformers might have been lessened had "filmmakers been willing to produce films for specialized audiences (adults only, family, no children) ... but the movers and shakers of the industry wanted or needed the largest possible market." The most provocative films were the most profitable, with the 25% of the motion picture industry's output that was the most sensational supporting the cleaner 75%.

By 1932, there was an increasing movement for government control. By mid-1934, when Cardinal Dougherty of Philadelphia called for a Catholic boycott of all films, and Raymond Cannon was privately preparing a congressional bill supported by both Democrats and Republicans that would introduce Government oversight, the studios decided they had had enough. They re-organized the enforcement procedures giving Hays and the recently appointed Joseph I. Breen, a devout Roman Catholic, head of the new Production Code Administration (PCA), greater control over censorship. The studios agreed to disband their appeals committee and to impose a $25,000 fine for producing, distributing, or exhibiting any film without PCA approval. Hays had originally hired Breen, who had worked in public relations, in 1930 to handle Production Code publicity, and the latter was popular among Catholics. Joy began working solely for Fox Studios, and Wingate had been bypassed in favor of Breen in December 1933. Hays became a functionary, while Breen handled the business of censoring films.

Breen initially had anti-Semitic prejudices, and was quoted as stating that Jews "are, probably, the scum of the earth". When Breen died in 1965, the trade magazine Variety stated, "More than any single individual, he shaped the moral stature of the American motion picture." Although the Legion's impact on the more effective enforcement of the Code is unquestionable, its influence on the general populace is harder to gauge. A study done by Hays after the Code was finally fully implemented found that audiences were doing the exact opposite of what the Legion had recommended. Each time the Legion protested a film it meant increased ticket sales; unsurprisingly, Hays kept these results to himself and they were not revealed until many years later. In contrast to big cities, boycotts in smaller towns were more effective and theater owners complained of the harassment they received when they exhibited salacious films.

Many actors and actresses, such as Edward G. Robinson, Barbara Stanwyck, and Clark Gable, continued their careers apace after the Code was enforced. However, others, such as Ruth Chatterton (who decamped to England around 1936) and Warren William (who died relatively young in the 1940s), who excelled during this period, are mostly forgotten today.

== Effects of the Code ==
Scenes such as this, in which a man is about to kiss a woman in bed in her nightgown (Warren William and Ann Dvorak in 1932's Three on a Match), were proscribed by the Production Code. After 1934, a scene such as this would not appear in a Hollywood film for decades.

Censors like Martin Quigley and Joseph Breen understood that a private industry code is more effective than government censorship. Private censorship can be more sweeping in its demands, because it is not bound by constitutional due process or freedom of expression rules. Termed by Breen as "Compensating moral value", the maxim was that "any theme must contain at least sufficient good in the story to compensate for, and to counteract, any evil which relates." Hollywood could present evil behavior, but only if it were eradicated by the end of the film, "with the guilty punished, and the sinner redeemed".

Pre-Code scholar Thomas Doherty summarized the practical effects:

Even for moral guardians of Breen's dedication, however, film censorship can be a tricky business. Images must be cut, dialogue overdubbed or deleted, and explicit messages and subtle implications excised from what the argot of film criticism calls the "diegesis". Put simply, the diegesis is the world of the film, the universe inhabited by the characters existing in the landscape of cinema. "Diegetic" elements are experienced by the characters in the film and (vicariously) by the spectator; "nondiegetic" elements are apprehended by the spectator alone. ... The job of the motion picture censor is to patrol the diegesis, keeping an eye and ear out for images, languages, and meanings that should be banished from the world of film. ... The easiest part of the assignment is to connect the dots and connect what is visually and verbally forbidden by name. ... More challenging is the work of the textual analysis and narrative rehabilitation that discerns and redirects hidden lessons and moral meanings.

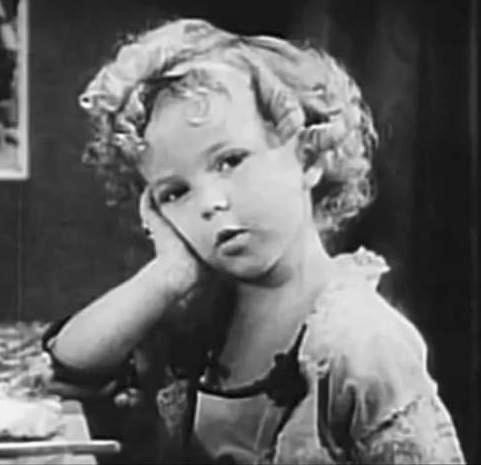
Shirley Temple, a rising star in 1934, was advertised as "an attraction that will serve as an answer to many of the attacks that are being hurled at pictures".

The censors thus expanded their jurisdiction from what was seen to what was implied in the spectator's mind. In The Office Wife (1930), several of Joan Blondell's disrobing maneuvers were strictly forbidden and the implied image of the actress being naked just off-screen was deemed too suggestive even though it relied upon the audience using their imaginations, so post-Code releases of the film had scenes that were blurred or rendered indistinct, if allowed at all.

Following the July 1, 1934, decision by the studios to put the power over film censorship in Breen's hands, he appeared in a series of newsreel clips promoting the new order of business, assuring Americans that the motion-picture industry would be cleansed of "the vulgar, the cheap, and the tawdry" and that movies would be made "vital and wholesome entertainment". All scripts now went through PCA, and several films playing in theaters were ordered withdrawn.

The first film Breen censored in the production stage was the Joan Crawford-Clark Gable film Forsaking All Others. Although Independent film producers vowed they would give "no thought to Mr. Joe Breen or anything he represents", they caved on their stance within one month of making it. The major studios still owned most of the successful theaters in the country, and studio heads such as Harry Cohn of Columbia Pictures had already agreed to stop making indecent films. In several large cities audiences booed when the Production seal appeared before films. But the Catholic Church was pleased, and in 1936 Pope Pius XI stated that the U.S. film industry "has recognized and accepts its responsibility before society". The Legion condemned zero films produced by the MPPDA between 1936 and 1943.

A coincidental upswing in the fortunes of several studios was publicly explained by Code proponents such as the Motion Picture Herald as proof positive that the code was working. Another fortunate coincidence for Code supporters was the torrent of famous criminals such as John Dillinger, Baby Face Nelson, and Bonnie and Clyde that were killed by police shortly after the PCA took power. Corpses of the outlaws were shown in newsreels around the country, alongside clips of Al Capone and Machine Gun Kelly in Alcatraz. The Code also saved the studios millions of dollars annually as they no longer had to edit, cut, and alter films to get approval from the various state boards and censors. A spate of more wholesome family films featuring performers such as Shirley Temple took off.

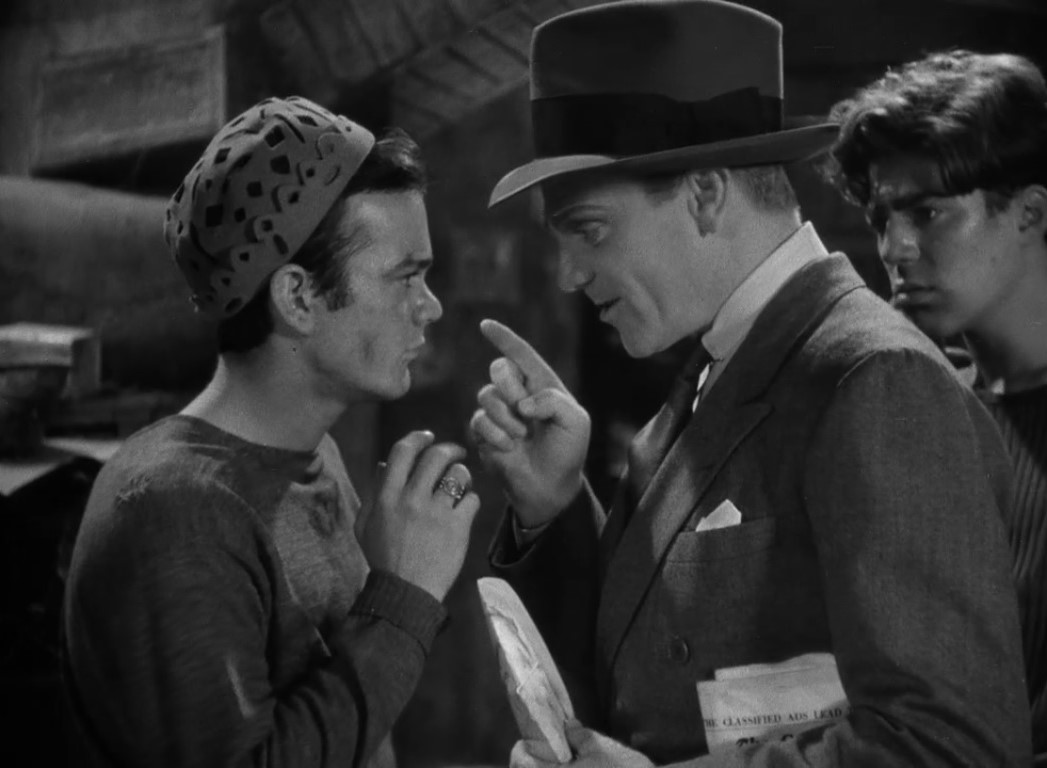
Leo Gorcey and James Cagney in Angels with Dirty Faces (1938)

Stars such as James Cagney redefined their images. Cagney played a series of patriots, and his gangster in Angels with Dirty Faces (1938) purposefully acts like a coward when he is executed so children who had looked up to him would cease any such admiration. Breen greatly censored Groucho Marx, removing most of his jokes that directly referenced sex, although some sexual references slipped through unnoticed in the Marx Brothers post-Code projects. In the political realm, films such Mr. Smith Goes to Washington (1939), in which James Stewart tries to change the American system from within while reaffirming its core values, stand in stark contrast to Gabriel Over the White House, where a dictator is needed to cure America's woes.

Some pre-Code movies suffered irreparable damage from censorship after 1934. When studios attempted to re-issue such films, they were forced to make extensive cuts. Films such as Mata Hari (1931), Arrowsmith (1931), Shopworn (1932), Love Me Tonight (1932), Dr. Monica (1934) and Horse Feathers (1932) exist only in their censored versions. Many other films survived intact because they were too controversial to be re-released, such as The Maltese Falcon (1931), and thus never had their master negatives edited. In the case of Convention City (1933), which Breen would not allow to be re-released in any form, the entire film remains missing.

== After the Code ==
The Production Code continued to be enforced, but during the lead-up to World War II, the Hollywood studios worried that adhering to the Code would reduce their overseas profits from Europe. At the same time, Hays warned about films being used for propaganda purposes.

Hays stepped down in 1945, after 24 years as Hollywood's chief censor, but remained an advisor. His successor, Eric Johnston, rebranded the association as the Motion Picture Association of America (MPAA). In 1956, he oversaw the first major revision of the Production Code since it was created in 1930. This revision allowed the treatment of some subjects that had previously been forbidden, including abortion and the use of narcotics, so long as they were "within the limits of good taste". At the same time, the revisions added a number of new restrictions to the code, including outlawing the depiction of blasphemy and mercy killings in films.

Johnston died in 1963, and, after a three-year search, he was succeeded in 1966 by Jack Valenti, former aide to President Lyndon Johnson. In November 1968, Valenti replaced the Production Code with a system of voluntary film ratings, in order to limit censorship of Hollywood films and provide parents with information about the appropriateness of films for children. In addition to concerns about protecting children, Valenti stated in his autobiography that he sought to ensure that American filmmakers could produce the films they wanted, without the censorship that existed under the Production Code that had been in effect since 1934. The rating system went through some adjustments, but remains in effect.

== See also ==
- List of pre-Code films
- Video nasty – colloquial name for low-budget violent films
- Golden Age of Comic Books – ended by similar concerns over lack of censorship
