= Henry James Forman =

Henry James Forman (February 17, 1879 – January 3, 1966) was an American editor and author. He was famous for his 1933 book Our Movie Made Children, which was a summary of the Payne Fund Studies. The book has been described as an "alarmist tome", and was responsible for publicizing the study's more negative results.

== Early life and education ==
Henry James Forman was born February 17, 1879.

He graduated from Harvard University, A.B. (with special distinction in Philosophy), 1903. Later, he attend Ecole des Hautes Etudes Sociales in Paris.

== Career ==
He was on the staff of the New York Sun, 1903–1905. During the summer of 1905, he was special correspondent for the New York Sun, with Pres. Roosevelt during the Russo-Japanese Peace Conference, and a member of the President's suite on board the U.S.S. Mayflower when the President brought together the Russian and Japanese envoys.

He served as politics editor of the Literary Digest, December 1905 - October 1906; literary editor of Appleton's Magazine, July 1905 - October 1906; associate editor and general manager of the North American Review, 1906–10. In 1913, he was on the editorial staff of Collier's Weekly; 1914–18, managing editor of Collier's.

He contributed to leading English and U.S. magazines. Forman was co-author of the Outline of Literature. He was the American delegate to Esperanto Congress, in Cambridge, England, 1907, and Dresden, 1908. In 1918–19, he served as the U.S. Agent of propaganda at Berne, Switzerland.

Forman was author of: In the Footprints of Heino, 1910; The Ideal Italian Tour, 1911; London: An Intimate Picture, 1913; The Captain of His Soul, a novel, 1914; Prisoner of the World (with Margaret Mayo), a play, produced 1919; Fire of Youth, а novel, 1920; The Man Who Lived in a Shoe, novel, 1922; The Enchanted Garden, novel, 1925; Guilt, mystery story, 1924; Grecian Italy, travel, 1924.

== Personal life ==
He married Miriam Chase, 1911.

He made his home in New York City.

== Death and legacy ==
Henry James Forman died January 3, 1966.

His papers are held by UCLA Library, Department of Special Collections.

== Sources ==
- Doherty, Thomas Patrick. Pre-Code Hollywood: Sex, Immorality, and Insurrection in American Cinema 1930-1934. New York: Columbia University Press, 1999. ISBN 0-231-11094-4
- Jowett, Garth S., Ian C. Jarvie, and Kathryn H. Fuller. Children and the movies: media influence and the Payne Fund controversy. Cambridge University Press, 1996. ISBN 0-521-48292-5
- Massey, Anne. Hollywood Beyond the Screen: Design and Material Culture. Berg Publishers, 2000. ISBN 1-85973-316-6
