= Our Movie Made Children =

Our Movie Made Children was written by Henry James Forman and published in May 1933. Commissioned by W.W. Charters, the Chairman of the Committee on Educational Research of the Payne Fund, Forman was "entrusted the task of preparing a popular summary" of the conclusions found by the various scholars who conducted the studies.

The investigations were conducted between 1929 and 1933 at the request of the Motion Picture Research Council and include:

- Motion Pictures and Youth by W.W. Charters, combined with

Getting Ideas From The Movies by P.W. Holiday and George D. Stoddard

- The Content of Motion Pictures and Children's Attendance at Motion Pictures by Edgar Dale
- The Emotional Responses of Children to the Motion Picture Situation by W.S. Dysing and Christian A. Ruckmick, combined with

Motion Pictures and Standards of Morality by Charles C. Peters

- Motion Pictures and the Social Attitudes of Children by Ruth C. Peterson and L.L. Thurstone, combined with

Relationship of Motion Pictures to the Character and Attitudes of Children by Mark A. May and Frank Shuttleworth

- Children's Sleep by Samuel Renshaw, Vernon A. Miller, and Dorothy Marquis
- Movie and Conduct by Herbert Blumer
- Movies, Delinquency, and Crime by Herbert Blumer and Philip M. Hauser
- Boys, Movies and City Streets by Paul G. Cressey and Frederick M. Thrasher
- How to Appreciate Motion Pictures by Edgar Dale

The Payne Fund, an organization "interested in the radio, motion pictures and reading in relation to children and youth", supported these independent studies. Our Movie Made Children, aimed at middle class mothers and religious groups, echoed the pro-censorship attitude behind the Payne Fund, and dramatized the threats movies posted to children. Criticized today as "emotional and inflammatory" the book, in its time was widely read because, although each study and the popular summary was to be an independently written volume of a series, Forman’s book was the first published and therefore often viewed, at the time, as the "authoritative public source".

Although Charters stated he had examined the accuracy of the claims made in Our Movie Made Children in his introduction to the book, he goes on to say that "[his] interpretations of the studies, however, his selection of illustrative material, his literary style, his dramatic and emphatic presentation are of necessity entirely his own".

Despite these loose interpretations and individual style, Forman delivers exactly what the supporters of the studies desired: to show that movies can have a powerful and influential effect on the attitudes, emotions, and behavior of children, to appeal to parents to understand that there must be further study on how to use film to the best advantage of their children, and to put pressure on filmmakers to produce better quality, morally agreeable products.

== Sources ==
- Forman, H.J. Our Movie Made Children. The MacMillan Company, New York, New York, May 1933.
- Jarvis, Arthur R. The Payne Fund Reports: A Discussion on their Content, Public Reaction and Affect on the Motion Picture Industry, 1930-1940, Journal of Popular Culture; Fall 1991; Vol. 25; Issue 2.
- Nichols, John. Countering Censorship: Edgar Dale and the Film Appreciation Movement, Cinema Journal 46; No. 1; Fall 2006
