= Payne Fund Studies =

Series of studies investigating the effects of media on minors

The Payne Fund Studies were a series of thirteen studies conducted over a four-year period from 1929 to 1933, and later published between 1933 and 1936 which aimed to determine the effects of movies on the behaviour of children and adolescents. They were the first attempt to rigorously study the media, as well as the first attempt to develop a social science research model using quantitative and qualitative methods to measure the effects that mass media have on individuals. The Payne Fund Studies are still considered the most extensive evaluation of the role that motion pictures play on individuals in American society.

These studies emerged due to an initial aim of developing a national policy in the United States regarding the regulation of motion pictures. At the time of these studies, the mass media only included recorded music, the radio, the press and the movies. In post-World War One America, educators and government officials were becoming increasingly concerned about the role that movies played on children's behaviour. Academics began to ask questions, such as whether people were susceptible to persuasion by modern communications, or whether the media could make people's behaviour worse. Initially, the main research question for the Payne Fund studies was "How were movies affecting the Youth of America?" Later, the research aim developed to "providing a broader understanding of the total effect at home and abroad of motion pictures." However, after this, the researchers decided not to investigate international effects due to the technical complexity of conducting the study. This meant that the final research aim was to provide data for answering completely, or in part, a wide range of separate queries relating to effects of motion pictures on the youth of America.

These studies were conducted at Yale University, New York University, Penn State University and The Ohio State University. Professor W. W. Charters was the research director of the Payne Fund Studies. He was the head of the Department of Education Research at The Ohio State University. Reverend William H. Short, who was the Director of the Motion Picture Research Council, came up with the idea for the Payne Fund Studies. Short was interested in "the vast influence of the motion picture in shaping attitudes and social values." Short had personal connections with the Payne Study and Experimental Fund, a foundation which was dedicated to youth welfare, which is what led to this fund financing the Payne Fund Studies.

During the progress of these studies, Charters developed a formula which was intended to determine the total influence of movies on children:

General Influence x Content x Attendance = Total Influence

There were a wide variety of research methods used in these studies, including questionnaires, unstructured interviews, content analysis, autobiographies, physiological measurement, and standardised tests.

== Specific studies ==
One of the studies in the Payne Fund Studies was called "Movies and Conduct." It was conducted in 1929 by Herbert Blumer, who was a graduate and faculty member from the University of Chicago. Blumer aimed to use qualitative measurements to investigate the effects of movies on the behaviour of children and adolescents, particularly looking at how films create "conceptions of the self" which challenge traditional influences from the home, family and community. Blumer collected "movie autobiographies" where he asked teenage and young adult participants to recall their experiences with movies. After collecting autobiographies from 634 students from two universities, 481 students from four colleges and junior colleges, 583 students from high school, 67 from young office workers and 58 from young factory workers, Blumer concluded that childhood impersonation from movies had no damaging long-term consequences as children would only imitate characters on screen for a short period of time. Blumer also concluded that "motion pictures are a genuine education institution that could prompt the young toward good or ill."

Another study in the Payne Fund Studies aimed to investigate how children's behaviour and attitudes were shaped by all exposure to the movies. They concluded that children who watched more movies on average performed worse in school work, were rated lower by their teachers, behaved less cooperatively, more deceptively, with less emotional stability, and with lower levels of self-control.

Additionally, one study in the Payne Fund Studies explored how movies could affect the socialisation process of a young child. Specifically, they looked at the development of views about nationality, race, war and the punishment of criminals. This study concluded that "motion pictures have definite, lasting effects on the social attitudes of children."

One final study in the Payne Fund Studies argued that additional factors such as those that are social, familial, situational and individual differences should be taken into account when assessing the impact of film on behaviour.

== Continuing relevance ==
It is impossible to estimate the precise impact that the Payne Fund Studies have had. These studies did not conclusively prove that movies had a significant influence on children and adolescents, but did demonstrate how they have the capacity to socialise and educate. Specifically, the findings were used in the Neeley-Pettengill bill in 1936 which attacked the film industry in front of the Interstate Commerce Committee of the House. Additionally, Willard Rowland used the Payne Fund Studies as a precursor to introduce later governmental studies examining the effects of television on children's violent behaviour.

== Reception ==
Newspapers including Cleveland's The Plain Dealer, New Orleans Times Picayune, Chicago Daily News, Atlanta Journal, Saint Paul Dispatch, the Philadelphia Record and Public Ledger, the Boston American and New York's Daily News, Daily Mirror, and Evening Post all lambasted the studies.

== Sources ==
- Black, Gregory D. Hollywood Censored: Morality Codes, Catholics, and the Movies. Cambridge University Press (1996); ISBN 0-521-56592-8
- Rodman, George, Mass Media in a Changing World: History, Industry, Controversy, 2nd ed., McGraw Hill; ISBN 0-07-722453-1
