= Odyssey series =

Series of home video game consoles

- Manufacturer: Magnavox, Philips
- Type: Series of home video game consoles
- Generation: First generation Second generation
- Lifespan: NA: 1972—1978

Magnavox Odyssey is the general brand name of Magnavox's complete line of home video game consoles released from 1972 through 1978. The line includes the original Magnavox Odyssey console, the Magnavox Odyssey series of dedicated home video game consoles, and the Magnavox Odyssey 2, a ROM cartridge-based video game console released in 1978. Philips Odyssey is the brand name that includes the Philips Odyssey series of dedicated home video game consoles.

Magnavox sold a total of 1,773,918 units across the entire Odyssey brand between 1972 and 1981 with a total sales value of around $71,300,000.00. Nearly half of those sales occurred between August 1972 and September 1976 with total sales at that time being around $45,000,000.00 selling 800,000 units.

== Magnavox Odyssey (1972) ==
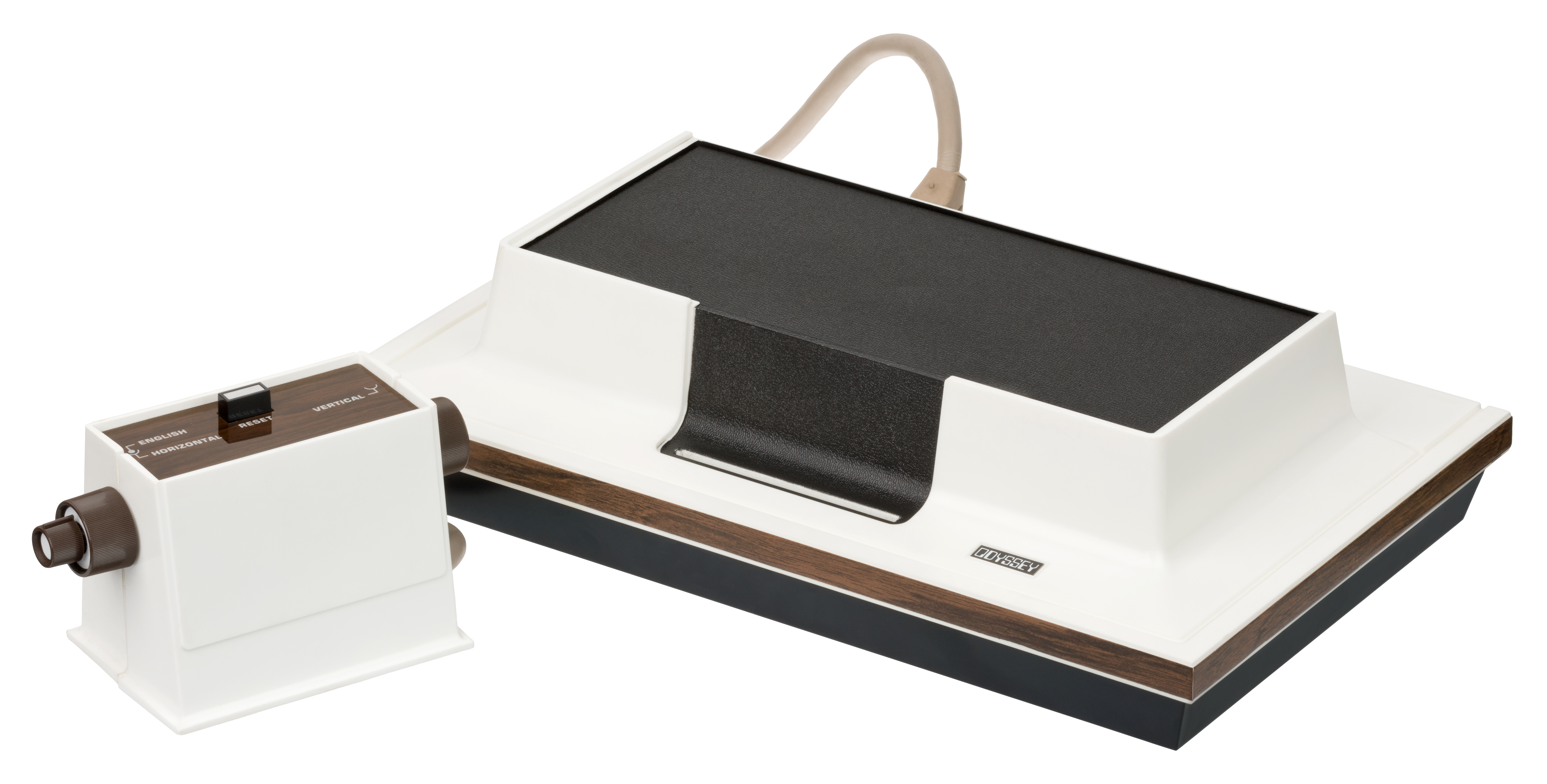
A Magnavox Odyssey and one of its two accompanying game controllers

The Magnavox Odyssey, released by Magnavox in September 1972, is the world's first commercial video game console. Designed by Ralph H. Baer and first demonstrated on a convention in Burlingame, California on May 24, 1972, it was sold by Magnavox and affiliates through 1975. The Odyssey uses a type of removable printed circuit board card that inserts into a cartridge slot, allowing the player to select the unit's various games by connecting different paths along the unit's internal logic circuitry. They do not contain any programming.

== Magnavox Odyssey series (1975–1977) ==
There are eight dedicated home video game consoles and one TV with a built-in game console in the Odyssey series. All of these consoles were released in the US by Magnavox after its purchase by Philips in 1974.

=== Magnavox Odyssey 100 ===
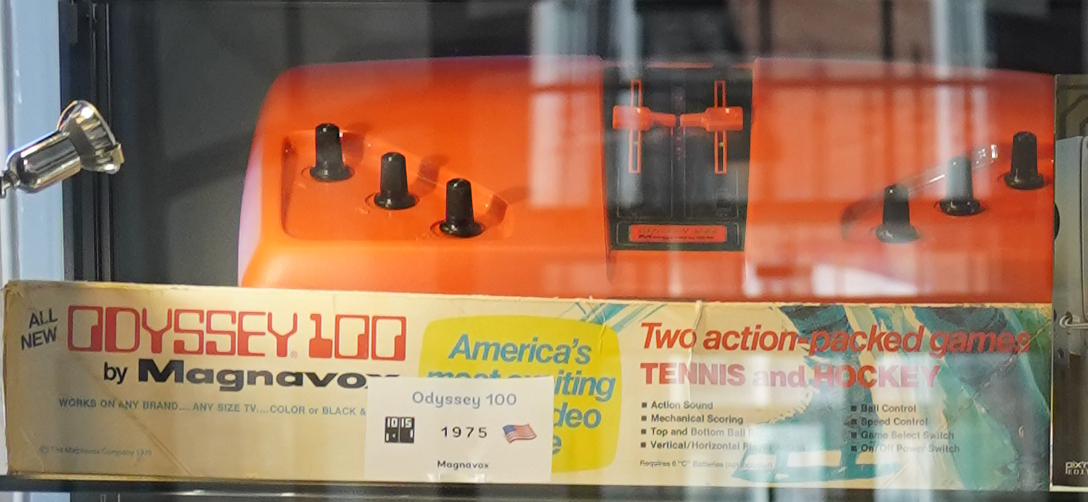
Magnavox Odyssey 100

The Magnavox Odyssey 100 dedicated console was announced in the Spring of 1975 with first shipments on October 30 and a launch price of $99.95, although pricing dropped quickly with pricing listed at $80 by June 1976 and by Christmas of 76 as low as $39.95. It uses a multi-chip discrete component design, which makes it much simpler than all later dedicated consoles Magnavox would eventually release. Magnavox already had a single-chip design in mind that year, but wanted to have a product they could release immediately if Texas Instruments, the supplier of their single video game chips, was unable to deliver in a timely manner.

The Odyssey 100 was designed around four Texas Instruments chips. It has two games (Tennis and Hockey). Neither game had on-screen scoring and the system used a crude buzzer for sound. The Odyssey 100 is powered by either six "C" batteries or a 9 volt AC adapter. Each player had three knobs for horizontal movement, vertical movement and ball trajectory adjustment ("English").

=== Magnavox Odyssey 200 ===
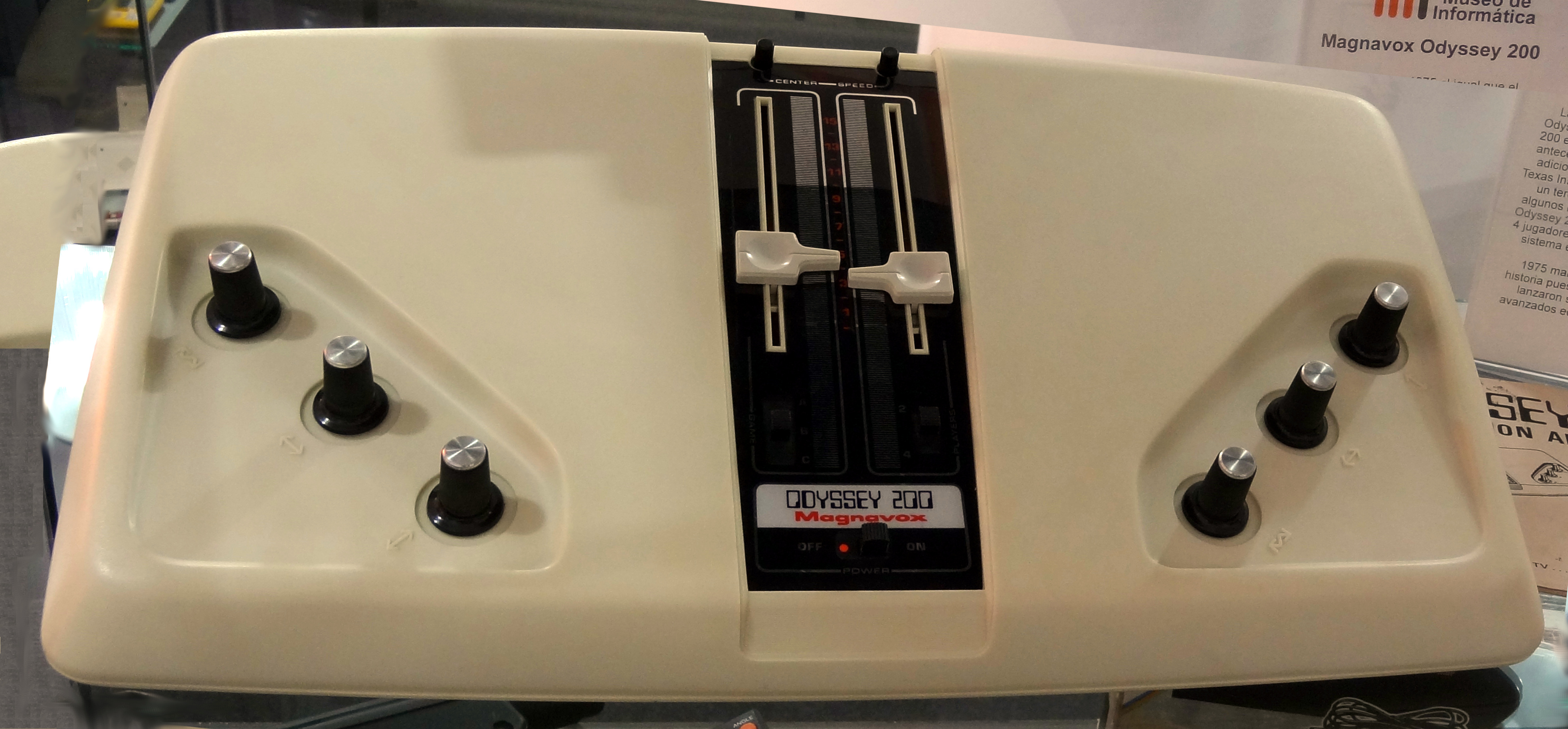
Magnavox Odyssey 200

The Magnavox Odyssey 200 dedicated console was released in 1975 as a deluxe companion of the Odyssey 100. Marketed at the same time as the Odyssey 100, it began shipping units on November 12, 1975 at $129.95. Using the same TI multi-chip design, but adding 2 chips, the console improved on the Odyssey 100 in several areas. In addition to Tennis and Hockey, the Odyssey 200 featured a third game variation called "Smash" (essentially, the sport known as Squash). The Odyssey 200 was also the first dedicated system to feature an option for four on-screen paddles instead of the customary two. The game manual, as well as Magnavox's service documentation describe this as an option for two or four "players," although the console itself can only be physically operated by two persons; consequently, the 200 is frequently and erroneously described as a "four-player" console today. The Odyssey 200 also added a unique method of non-digital on-screen scoring in which a white rectangle moved one space to the right each time a player scored a point. Like the Odyssey 100, the Odyssey 200 is powered by either six "C" batteries or a 9 volt AC adapter and uses three control dials for vertical and horizontal movement and ball "english."

=== Magnavox Odyssey 300 ===
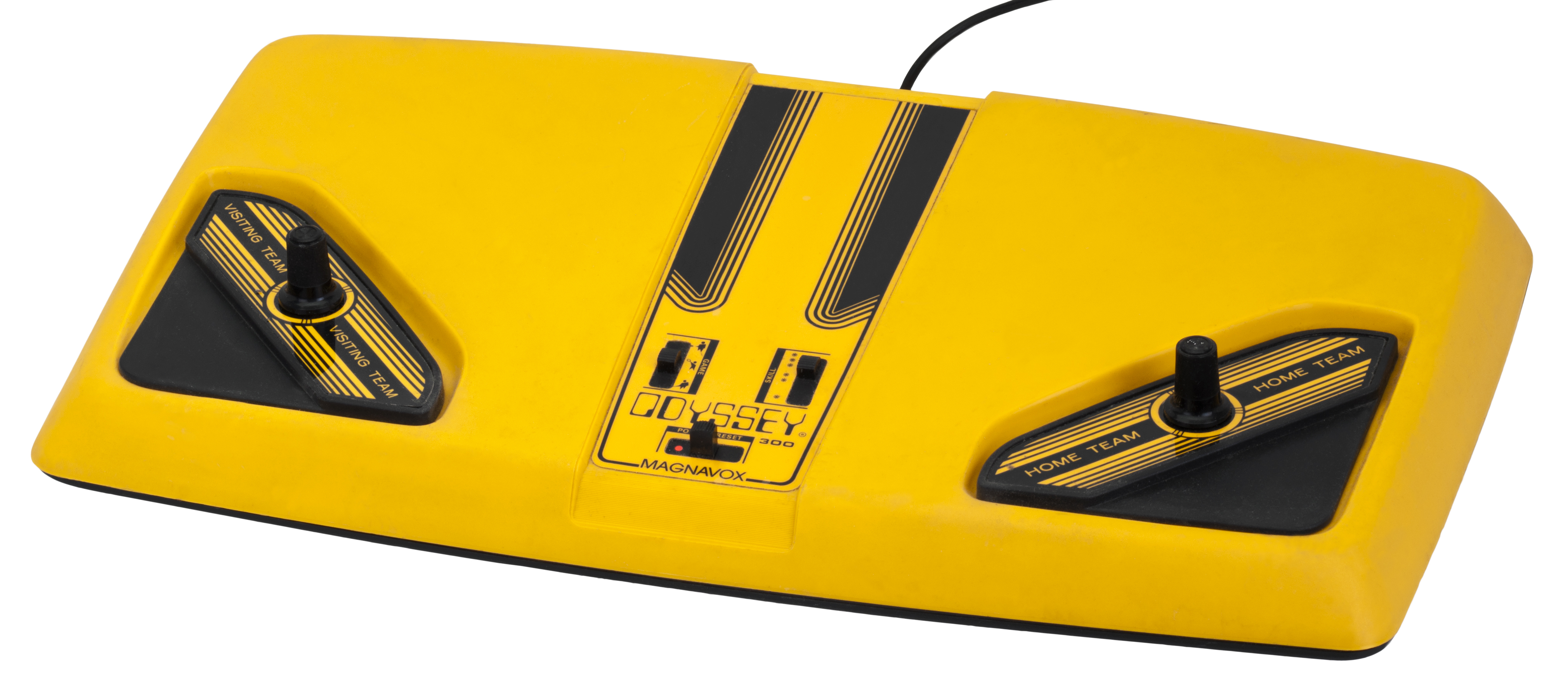
Magnavox Odyssey 300

The Magnavox Odyssey 300 dedicated console, announced in May 1976, it was released in October for US$69. Unlike Magnavox's previous two dedicated console products, the Odyssey 300 was meant to compete directly with the Coleco Telstar. Like the Telstar, the Odyssey 300 uses the AY-3-8500 chip as its logic and was among the first dedicated consoles to use a single IC chip as the focus of its design rather than multiple computer chips or transistor–transistor logic. The Odyssey 300 has the same three games as the Odyssey 200, although, owing to its usage of the AY-3-8500, their gameplay more closely resembles Atari's Pong than Magnavox's previous games; horizontal control was absent, ball angle was automated, and the games are controlled with a single dial instead of three. Unlike the 200, the Odyssey 300 console has three difficulty levels: Novice, Intermediate, and Expert. Also owing to its implementation of the AY-3-8500, the 300 introduced digital on-screen scoring.

=== Magnavox Odyssey 400 ===
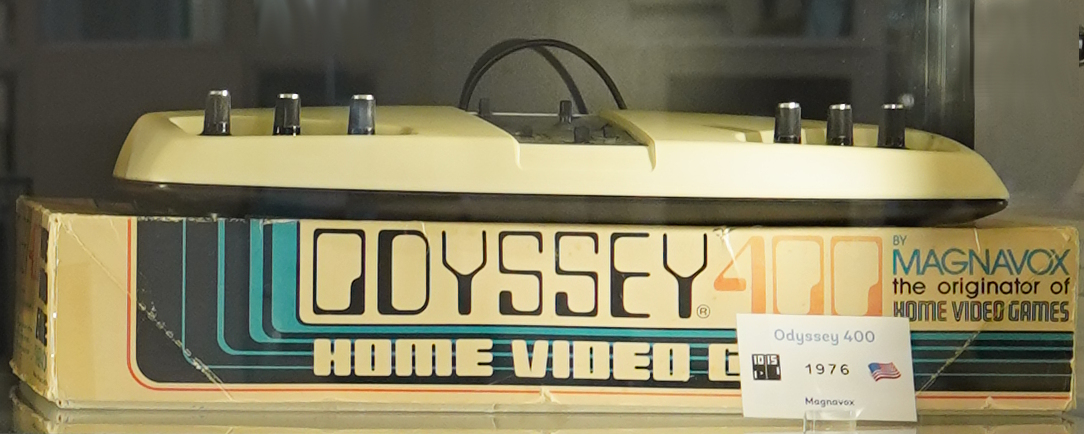
Magnavox Odyssey 400

The Magnavox Odyssey 400 dedicated console was released in 1976 for $100. The Odyssey 400 is an updated version of the Odyssey 200 with automatic serve and on-screen digital scoring features added. The console plays the same three games as the Odyssey 200—Squash (known as Smash), Tennis, and Hockey—and has the same three control dials for vertical movement, horizontal movement, and "english" control. An additional Texas Instruments chip was used to implement on-screen scoring; the mechanical score sliders of the 200 were dispensed with.

=== Magnavox Odyssey 500 ===
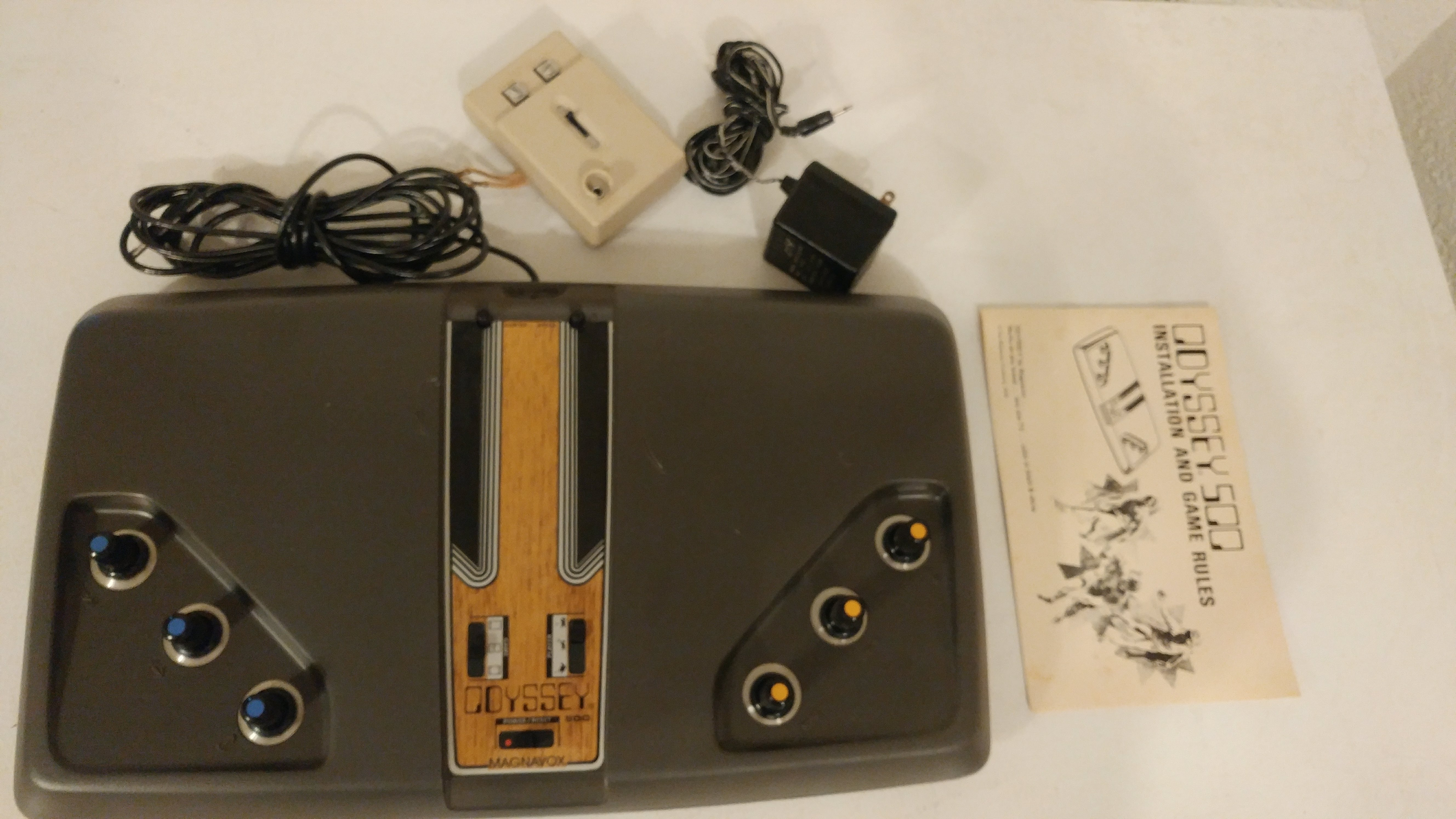
Magnavox Odyssey 500

The Magnavox Odyssey 500 (model number: 7520) was released in 1976 for $130 as Magnavox's high-end companion to the Odyssey 300 and Odyssey 400 systems. The Odyssey 500 is essentially a deluxe version of the Odyssey 400 with several crucial improvements. The 500 featured color graphics (the first Odyssey game unit to do so) and replaced the standard paddles with sprites representing the athletes of its various games: a tennis player, a squash player, and a hockey player. The three players and three playfields were each chosen by separate toggle switches; games were thus selected by matching the player to its appropriate playfield. In addition to the Smash, Hockey, and Tennis games, Odyssey 500 featured a fourth game, Soccer, by using the squash player graphics with the hockey playing field. Unlike the Odyssey 400, however, the 500 does not support four onscreen "players."

The Odyssey 500's manual acknowledged that the player graphics, being of different sizes, essentially represented different difficulty options. Interestingly, while Magnavox exploited the "mismatching" of players and playfields to market the Odyssey 500 as having a fourth game, the remaining five possible game combinations were not advertised or documented.

Odyssey 500 offers automatic serve, displays digital on-screen scores between plays, and provides manually adjustable ball speed control. As with all previous Odyssey units, power is delivered via an AC adapter or six "C" cell batteries.

=== Magnavox Odyssey 4305 ===
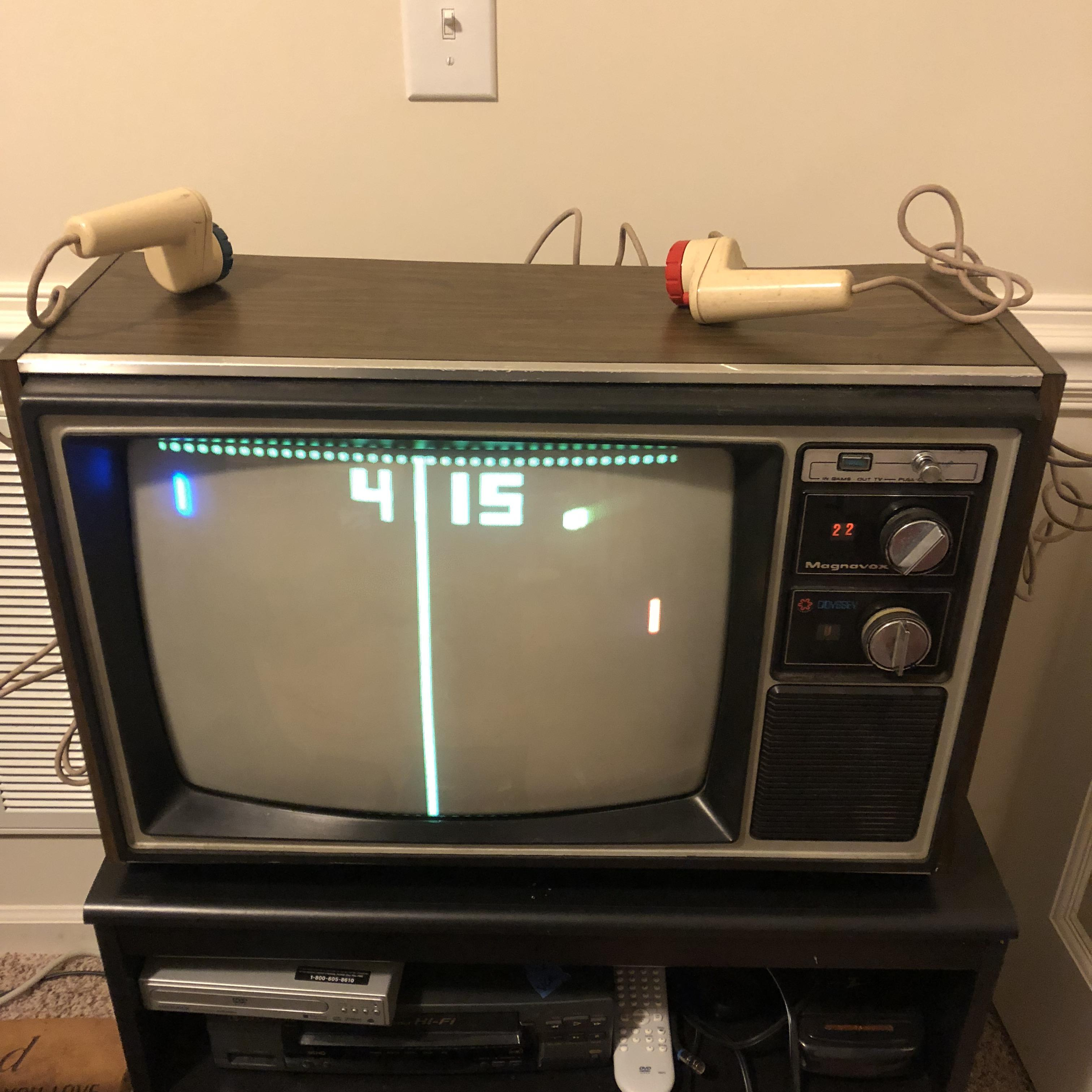
Magnavox Odyssey 4305

The Magnavox Odyssey 4305 (model number: 3616R061A) was released in 1976 or 1977 and is a 19 inch color TV with a built-in Magnavox Odyssey 300 or 500. The label on the backside of the TV reads "October 1976". It was sold for US$499. Its two wired game controllers are very similar to those of the Ping-O-Tronic, with each containing one button and a paddle. It is extremely rare.

=== Magnavox Odyssey 2000 ===
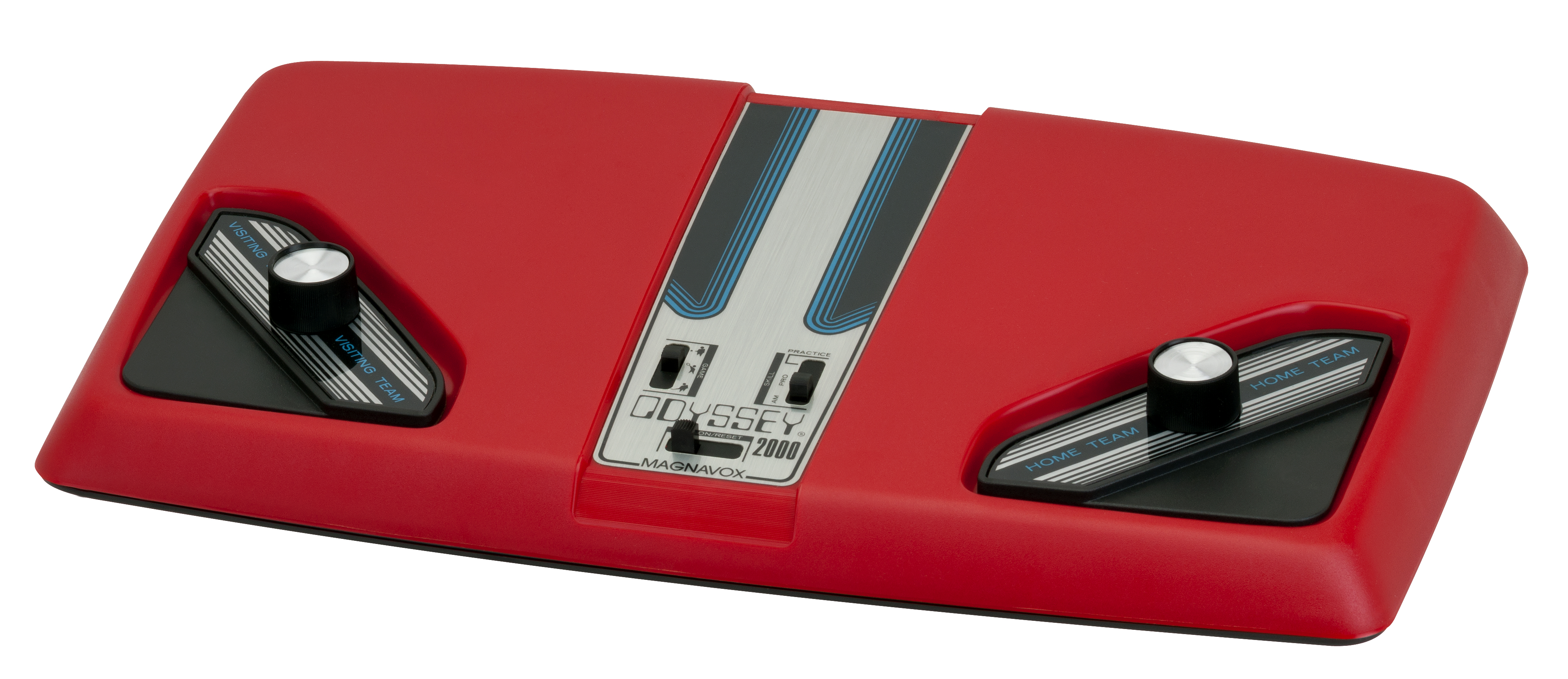
Magnavox Odyssey 2000

The Magnavox Odyssey 2000 (model number: BH7510) dedicated console was released in 1977. The Odyssey 2000 was basically an updated version of the Odyssey 300. Like the 300, the Odyssey 2000 uses the AY-3-8500 single-chip design (which is also used in the Odyssey 3000). The Odyssey 2000 is set up for two players and uses a single rotating knob for each player's game control instead of the three knobs used by earlier Magnavox dedicated video game consoles. In addition to the Tennis, Hockey, and Squash ("Smash") game variations, the Odyssey 2000 adds the Practice variation of one-player squash. Points scored during gameplay are shown at the top of the screen when each player scores and the winner is the first player to gain 15 points. Like earlier Odyssey models, the Odyssey 2000 is powered by either six "C" batteries or an optional AC adapter. The Odyssey 2000 has a built in speaker inside of it.

=== Magnavox Odyssey 3000 ===
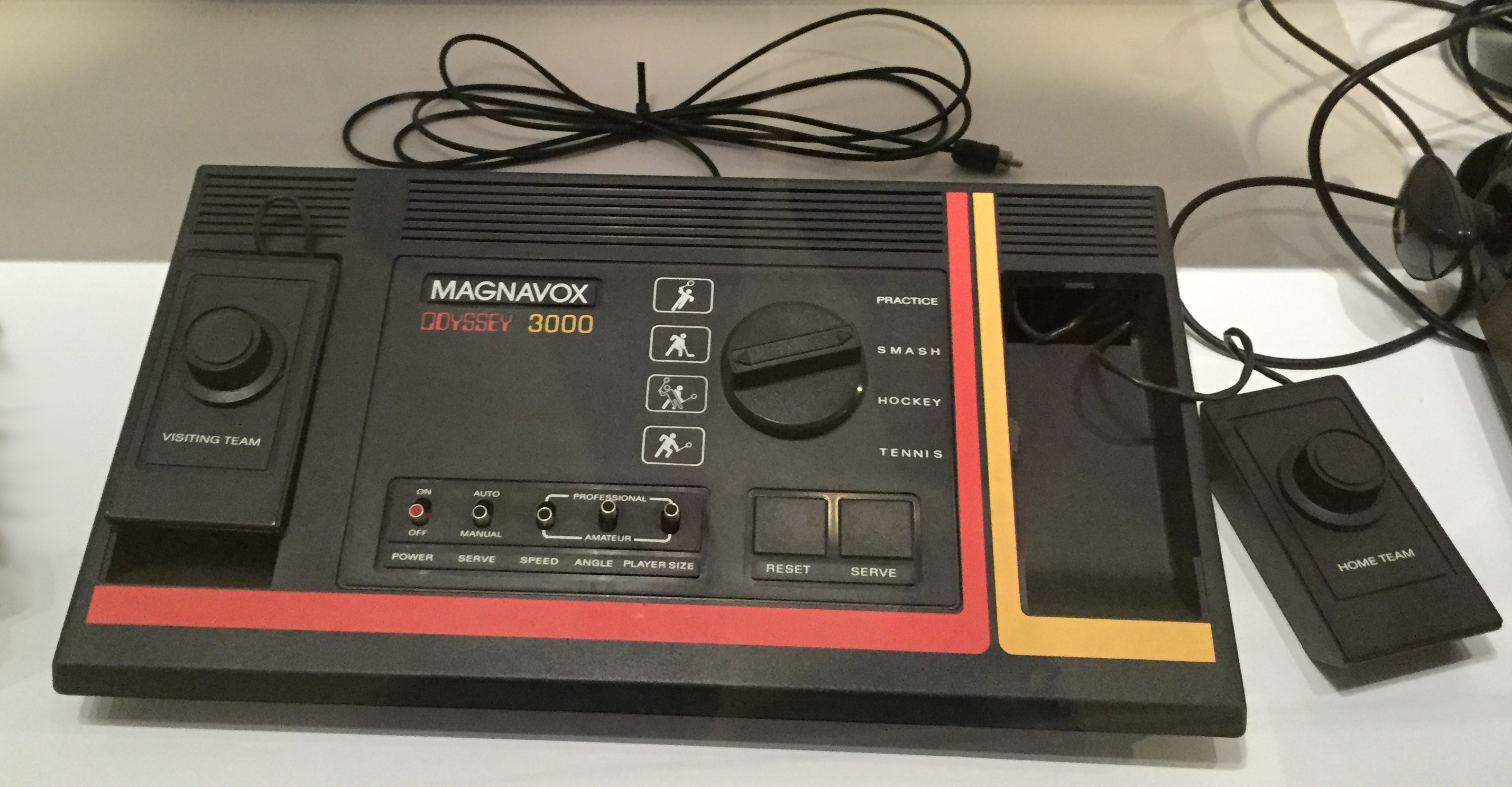
Magnavox Odyssey 3000

The Magnavox Odyssey 3000 (model number: 7508) dedicated console was released in 1977. The Odyssey 3000 features the same game variations as the Odyssey 2000 (Tennis, Hockey, Smash, Practice). The unit is set up for two players but a solo-play Practice mode for Smash is also available. A three-position handicap switch allows players to set skill level, and additional controls allow players to select automatic or manual serve, ball speed, and ball deflection angle (20 or 40 degrees). With the Odyssey 3000, Magnavox abandoned its old case design with one with a more contemporary style. The console itself is more angular and less rounded; two flat buttons are used for the serve and reset functions and the console settings knobs were reduced in size. The Odyssey 3000 uses a flat circular knob for selecting different games and unlike all previous Odyssey dedicated video game consoles, the Odyssey 3000 features detachable game paddles (without any fire buttons). The Odyssey 3000 is powered by either six "C" batteries or an optional AC adapter.

=== Magnavox Odyssey 4000 ===
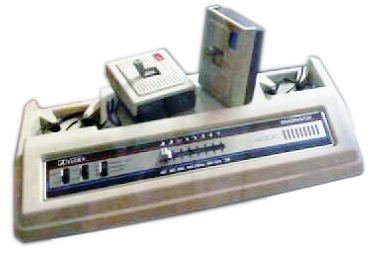
Magnavox Odyssey 4000

Magnavox concluded their line of dedicated video game consoles with the Magnavox Odyssey 4000. The Odyssey 4000 (model number: 7511) dedicated console was released in 1977. Based around the AY-3-8600 single-chip design, the Odyssey 4000 features a total of six games (Tennis, Hockey, Soccer, Basketball, Smash and Gridball and includes a Practice mode for solo-play in Basketball and Smash). As with the Odyssey 3000, the Odyssey 4000 offers a skill switch for novice, semi-pro, and professional skill levels. Additional features include automatic serve and variable ball speeds. Unlike the Odyssey 3000, the Odyssey 4000 featured detachable joysticks. The AY-3-8615 chip enabled the Odyssey 4000 to display their games in color instead of black and white graphics. The 4000 is powered by an included AC adapter. It's unknown how many Magnavox's Odyssey's 4000 were sold.

=== Magnavox Odyssey 5000 (prototype) ===
The Magnavox Odyssey 5000 would have contained two chips, National Semiconductor's MM571068 and Signetics' MUGS-1, and featuring a total of seven games (Tennis, Hockey, Volleyball, Basketball, Knockout, Tank, and Helicopter) which with variations could be expanded to twenty-four different gaming experiences. The unit would have allowed up to four players and included a Practice mode for solo-play against the computer. The console never was released commercially, and remained in development. Its prototype helped shape the next generation of Magnavox Odyssey home console, the Magnavox Odyssey 2.

== Philips Odyssey series (1976–1978) ==
Dutch electronics manufacturer Philips purchased Magnavox in 1974, after which it began to release its own versions of the dedicated Odyssey consoles in Europe.

=== Philips Odyssey 200 ===
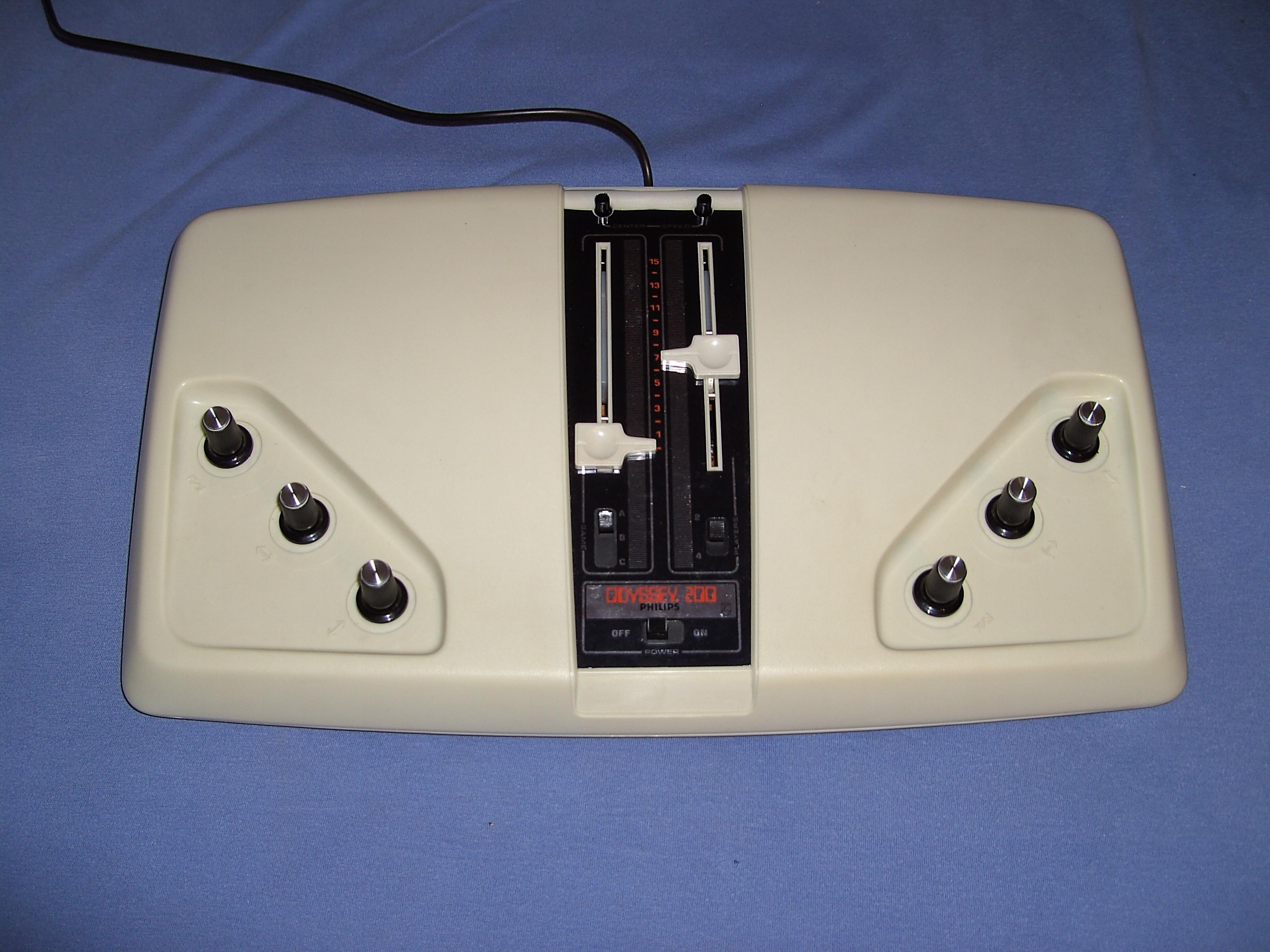
Philips Odyssey 200

The Philips Odyssey 200 is the same as its US released counterpart. Released across Europe in 1976, it was replaced by the Philips Odyssey 2000 in 1977.

=== Philips Odyssey 2000 ===
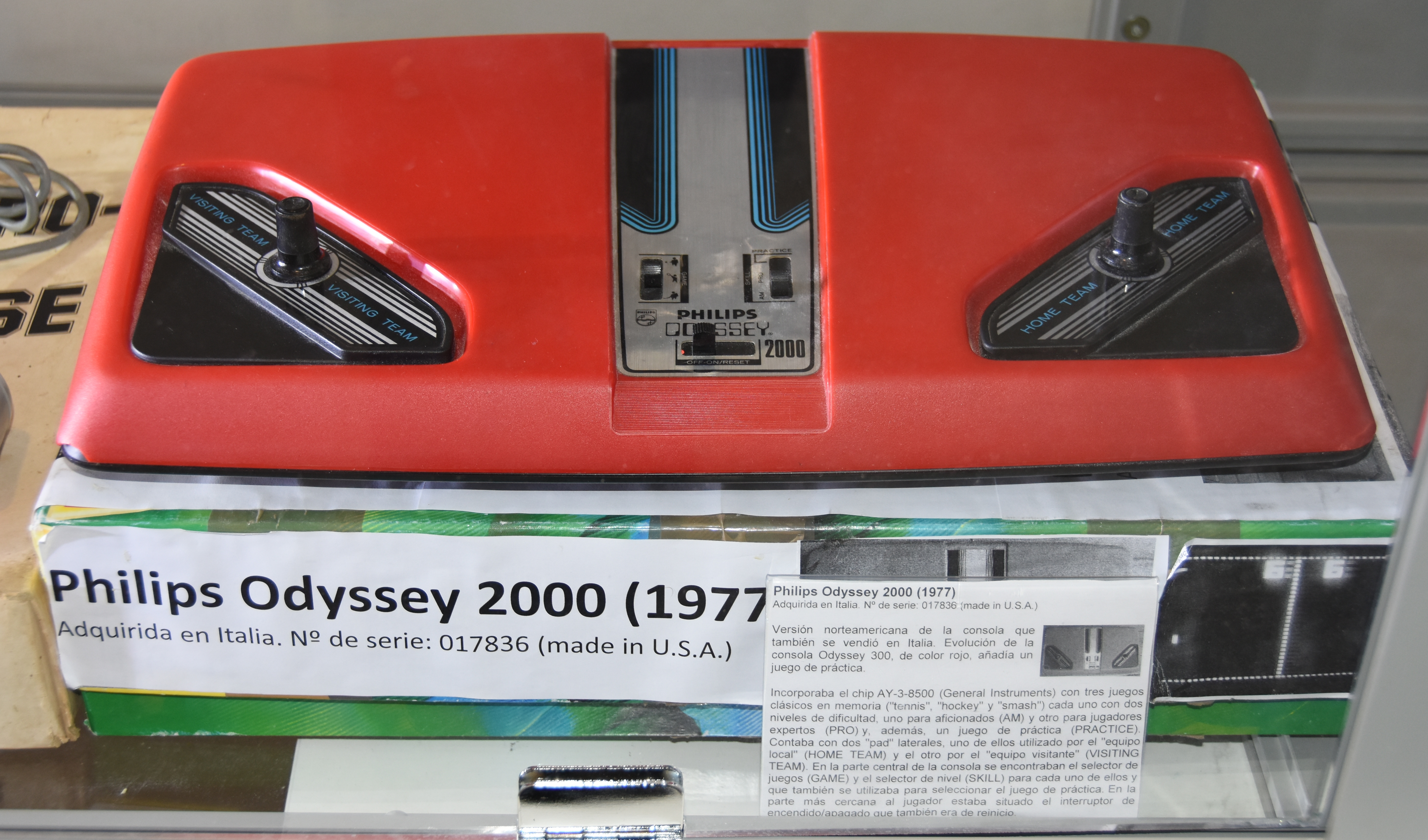
Philips Odyssey 2000

The Philips Odyssey 2000 is the same as its US released counterpart, with the exception that the European version features thin physical paddles while the American one has wide paddles. Released across Europe in 1977, it was replaced by the Philips Odyssey 2001 in 1977.

=== Philips Odyssey 2001 ===
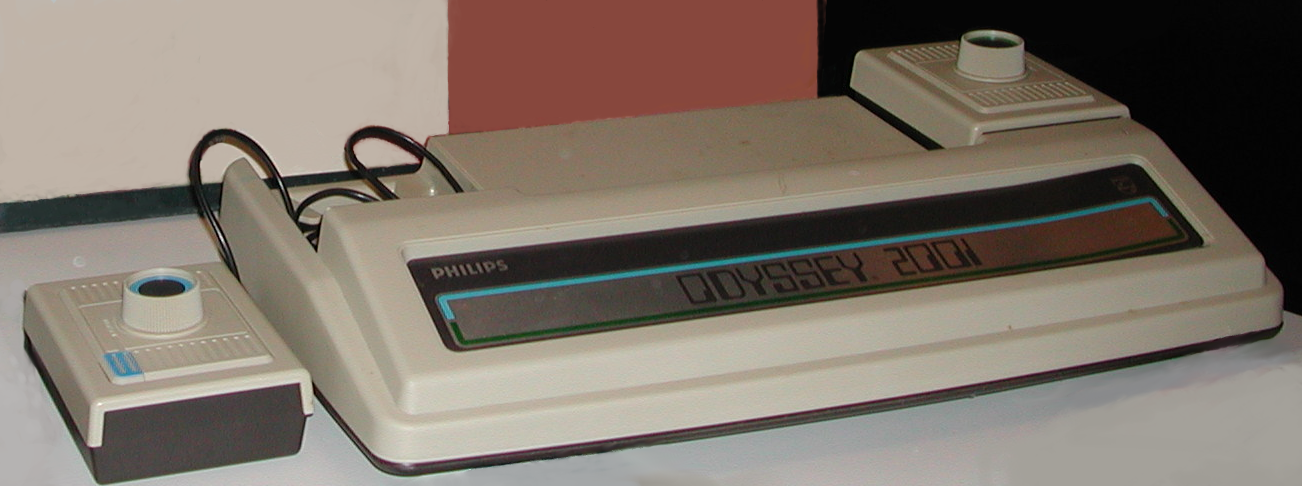
Philips Odyssey 2001

The Philips Odyssey 2001 is Philips' version of the Magnavox Odyssey 4000, with differences in the games offered and the use of detachable paddles instead of joysticks. Released in 1977, the Philips Odyssey 2001 is based on the National Semiconductor MM-57105 chip, which plays Tennis, Hockey, and Squash, and allows full color and direct sound on the TV.

=== Philips Odyssey 2100 ===
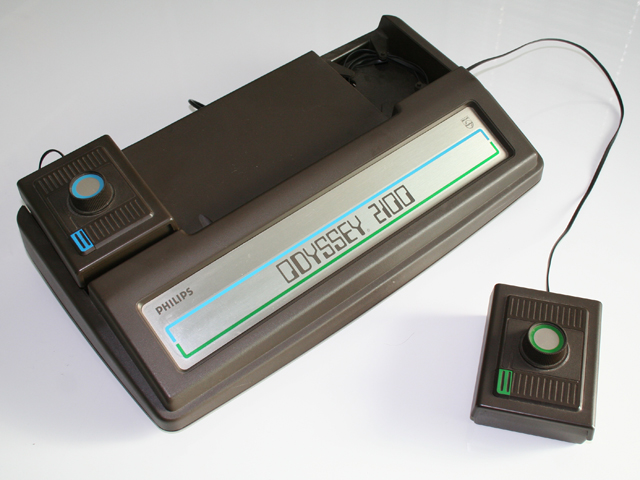
Philips Odyssey 2100

The Philips Odyssey 2100 was released in 1978 and uses the same case design as the 2001. Using the National Semiconductor MM-57186N chip, the Philips Odyssey 2100 plays 6 games with multiple variations: Wipe-Out (Breakout style, 7 variants), Flipper (7 variants), Tennis (2 variants), Handball (2 variants), Ice Hockey (2 variants), Football (3 variants).

== Magnavox Odyssey 2 (1978) ==
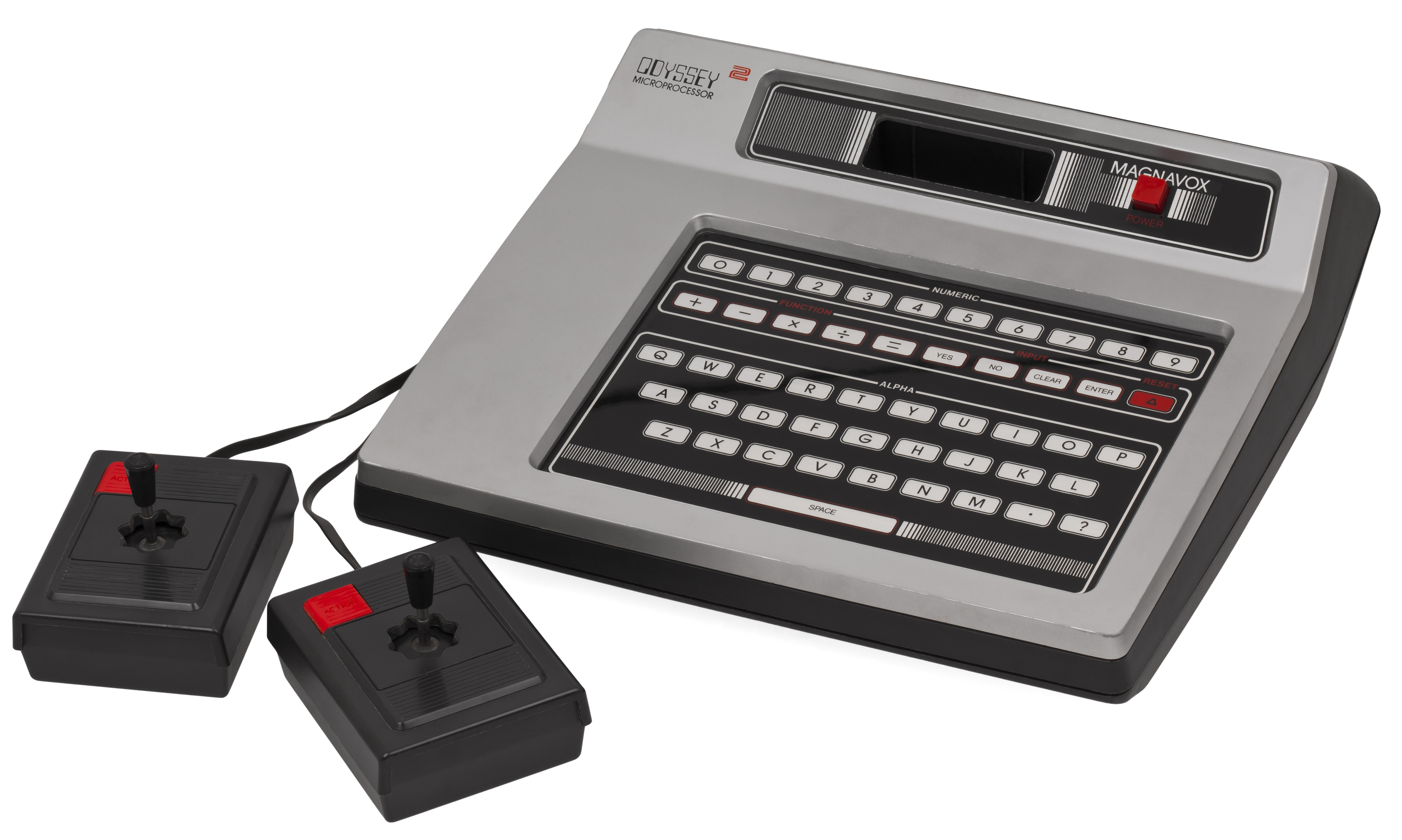
A Magnavox Odyssey² with its two accompanying game controllers

The Magnavox Odyssey 2 (stylized as Magnavox Odyssey²) is a second-generation home video game console developed by Philips' Odyssey division subsequent to its purchase of Magnavox in 1974. It was released in 1978.

== See also ==
- Philips Videopac+ G7400 - Developed by Philips as the Odyssey³ and intended to have backward compatibility with the Odyssey².
- Philips Tele-Game series - Another pong console series of Philips.
- Color TV-Game series - Another popular series of early video game consoles by Nintendo.
