= AY-3-8500 =

Integrated circuit by General Instrument

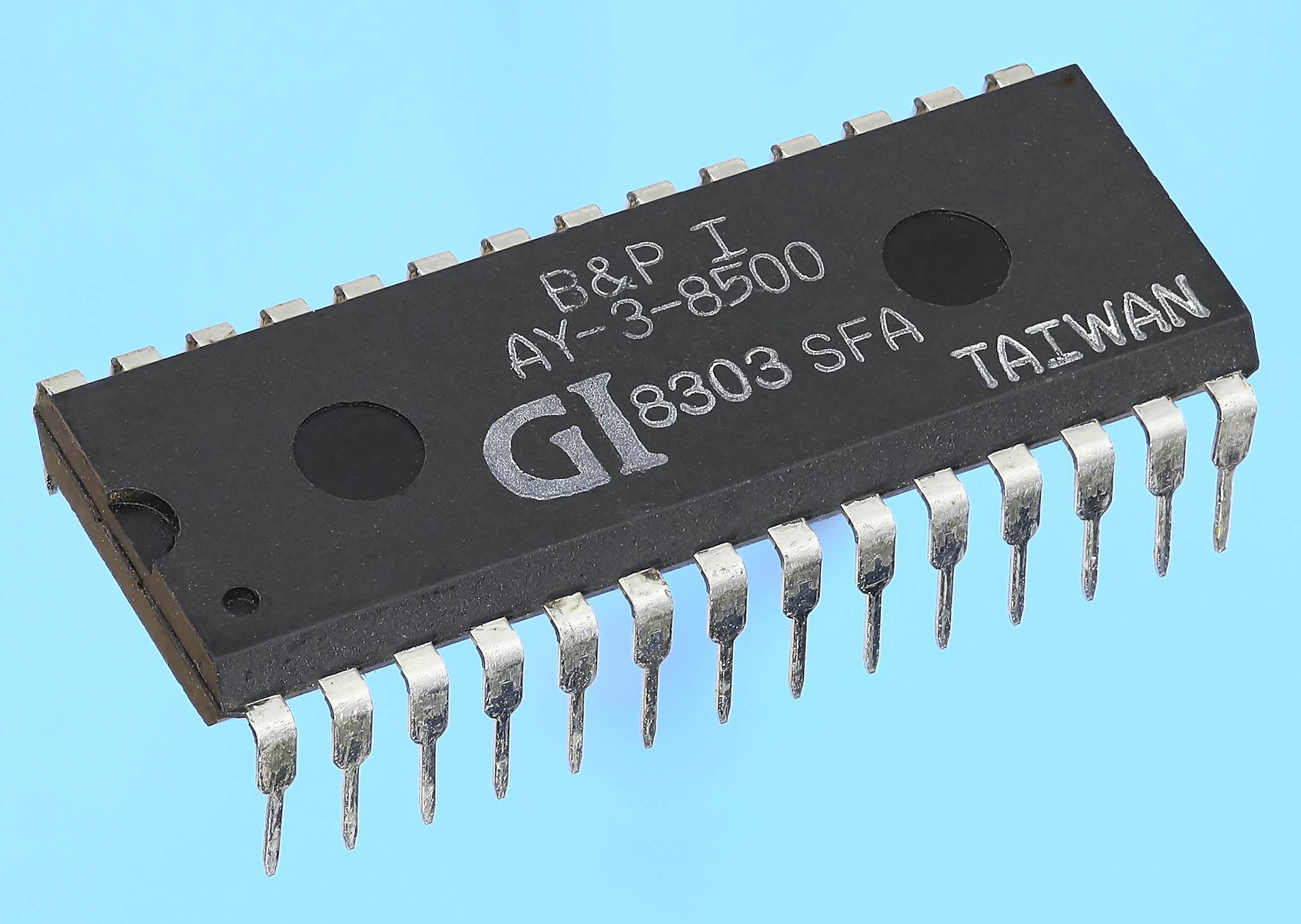
AY-3-8500 chip

The AY-3-8500 "Ball & Paddle" integrated circuit (IC, or "chip") was the first in a series of ICs from General Instrument designed for the consumer video game market. These chips output video to an RF modulator, which would then display the game on a domestic television set. It was introduced in 1976, Coleco becoming the first customer, having been introduced to the IC development by Ralph H. Baer. The lineup was later known as the GIMINI series. Approximately 5 million 8500s were sold and used in hundreds of different consoles.

The 8500 contained six selectable games — tennis (a.k.a. Pong), hockey (or soccer), squash, practice (single-player Pong), and two shooting games. The 8500 was the 625-line PAL version and the 8500-1 was the 525-line NTSC version. A minimum number of external components were needed to build a complete system. The video was in black-and-white, although it was possible to colorize the game by using an additional chip, the AY-3-8515.

The 8500 was later updated with the AY-3-8550, which used formerly unused pins on the 8500 to add two-axis control with a joystick instead of the more typical single-axis (up and down) control with a paddle. It was otherwise similar and played the same games, and could also be used with the 8515 for color support. The AY-3-8610, also known as the "Superstar", added several new games and required the new AY-3-8615 for color support.

As the games console market moved to ROM cartridges in the late 1970s, GI introduced the AY-3-8900, a separate video display controller intended to be used with their own CP1610 microprocessor. Although entirely different than the 8500 line, they were also considered part of the GIMINI lineup.

== History ==
The 8500 development was led by GI's Stephen Maine, working with Eric Berman and Duncan Harrower. Harrower had begun working on the concept in 1974. The system was announced in December 1975 and began shipping early the next year. Coleco was the first customer, with Radio Shack and Magnavox following. Ultimately it was used by "hundreds of different games systems" around the world, and over 5 million were sold in 1976 alone.

The company continued development of the 8500 series, introducing new dedicated games chips. However, as they noted, "dedicated television game chips consumed huge resources to develop", a problem also noted by competitor Atari at the same time. Both companies began developing new second-generation systems, using a general purpose central processing unit (CPU) to handle logic, and a dedicated video display unit (VDU) to produce the graphics.

== AY-3-8500 ==
=== Games ===
Game	No. of players
Practice	1
Shooting game 1	1
Shooting game 2	2
Tennis	2
Hockey/Soccer	2
Squash	2

Six selectable games for one or two players were included:

In addition, a seventh undocumented game could be played when none of the previous six was selected: Handicap, a hockey variant where the player on the right has a third paddle. This game was implemented on very few systems.

=== Usage ===
AY-3-8500

The AY-3-8500 was designed to be powered by six 1.5 V cells (9 V). Its specified operation is at 6-7 V and a maximum of 12 V instead of the 5 V standard for logic. The nominal clock was 2.0 MHz, yielding a 500 ns pixel width. One way to generate such a clock is to divide a 14.31818 MHz 4 × NTSC color burst clock by 7, producing 2.04545 MHz. It featured independent video outputs for left player, right player, ball, and playground+counter, that were summed using resistors, allowing designers to use a different luminance for each one. It was housed in a standard 28-pin DIP. The image could be colorized using the AY-3-8515 chip, which converted luminance values to pre-selected colors.

=== Applications ===
Some of the dedicated consoles employing the AY-3-8500 (there are at least two hundred different consoles using this chip):

- Sears Hockey Pong
- Coleco Telstar series (Coleco Telstar, Coleco Telstar Classic, Coleco Telstar Deluxe, Coleco Telstar Ranger, Coleco Telstar Alpha, Coleco Telstar Colormatic, Coleco Telstar Regent, Coleco Telstar Sportsman)
- Odyssey series (Magnavox Odyssey 300, Magnavox Odyssey 2000 and Magnavox Odyssey 3000)
- RadioShack TV Scoreboard
- Unisonic Sportsman/Tournament
- Philips Tele-Game ES 2203 Las Vegas and Philips Tele-Game ES 2204 Las Vegas
- Play-O-Tronic
- Videomaster (Strika, Strika 2, ColourScore 2, SuperScore)
- APF TV Fun (Model 401)
- Sportsmaster TVG 901
- Prinztronic Micro Ten Deluxe Colour TV Game (United Kingdom)
- Ameprod Television Game 10 (one of a few consoles made in Poland)
- Adman Grandstand TV game 2000
- Bildschirmspiel 01, the GDR's only game console
- Hanimex 7771
- Mustang 9012

== AY-3-8550 ==
The AY-3-8550 was the next chip released by General Instruments. It featured horizontal player motion, and a composite video output. It was pin compatible with the AY-3-8500. It needed an additional AY-3-8515 chip to output video in color.

=== Games ===
Game	No. of players
Practice	1
Shooting game 1	1
Shooting game 2	2
Tennis	2
Hockey/Soccer	2
Squash	2

Six selectable games for one or two players were included:

=== Usage ===
The AY-3-8550 used the No Connect pins from the AY-3-8500, so it was possible to put an AY-3-8550 on an AY-3-8500 (without horizontal movement), and vice versa.

AY-3-8550

=== Application ===
This is a list of consoles that use this chip:

- Tele-Game ES 2208 Las Vegas

== AY-3-8610 ==
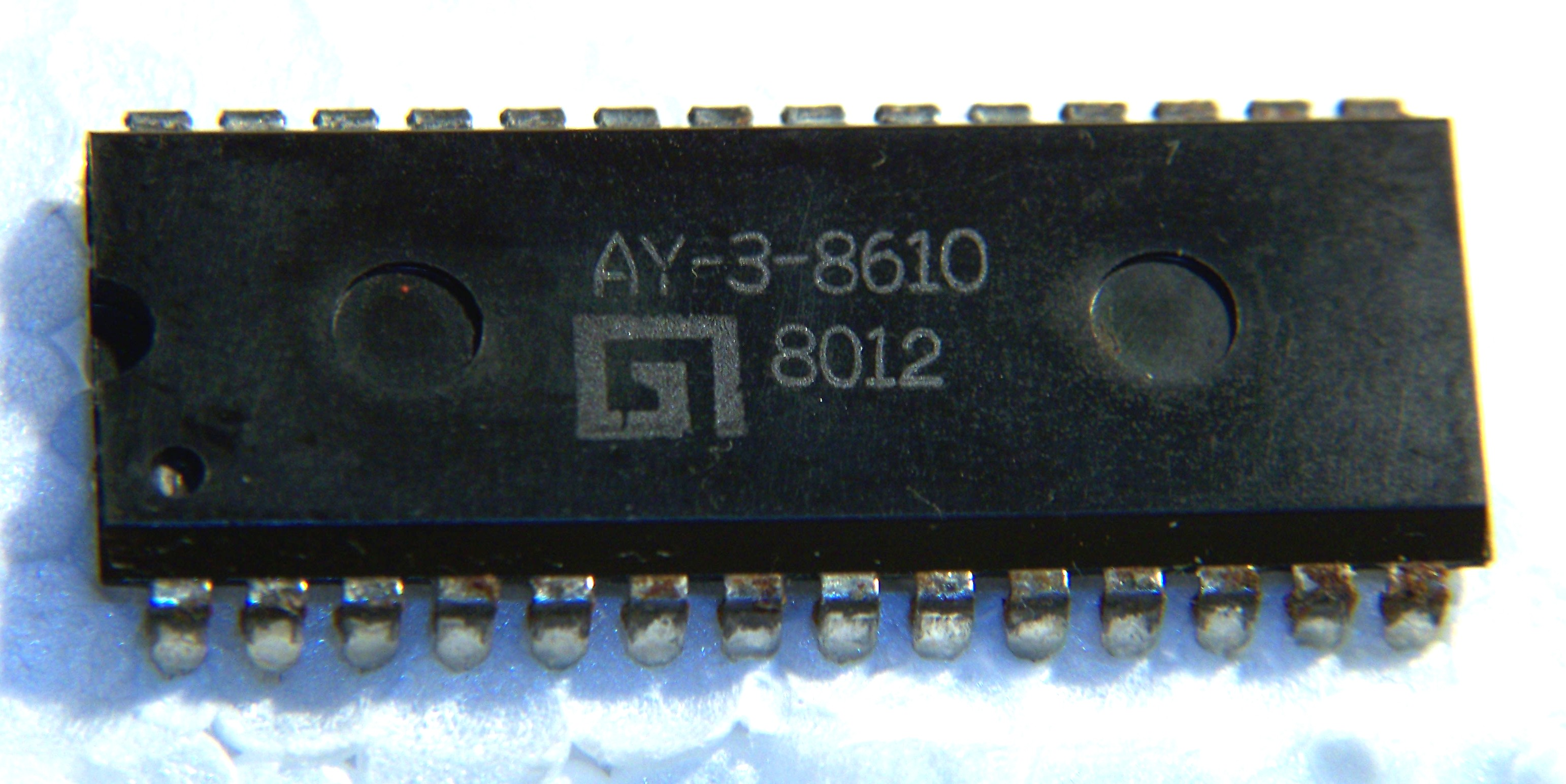
AY-3-8610 chip from 1980

The AY-3-8610 was a major update from General Instruments. It played more games (10), like basketball or hockey, with higher-quality graphics. It was nicknamed "Superstar" by GI. It was in black and white, although it was possible to add color by using an additional AY-3-8615 chip.

Prior to producing the 8610, GI created the AY-3-8600. The pin configuration was the same as the 8610, but it was missing the two rifle/target games, bringing the total number of games down to 8.

=== Games ===
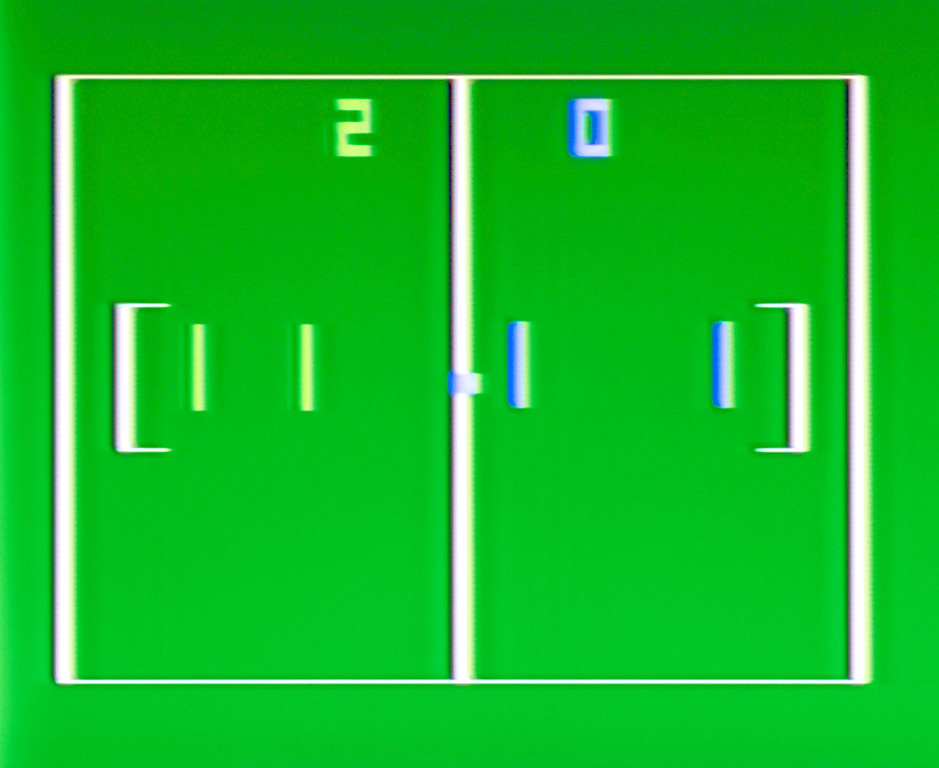
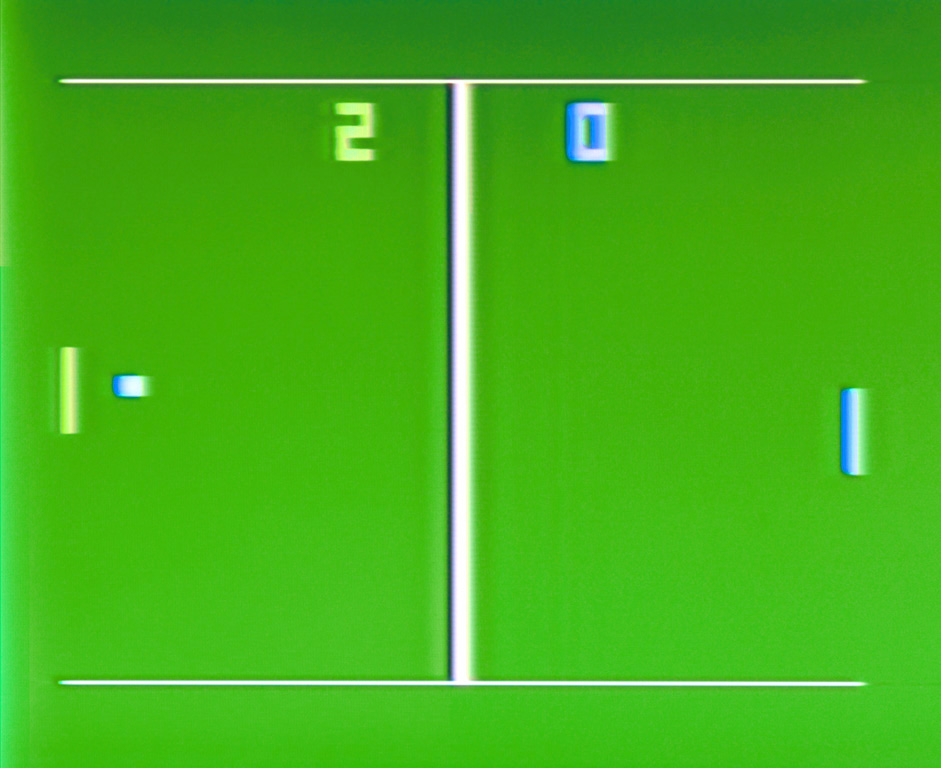
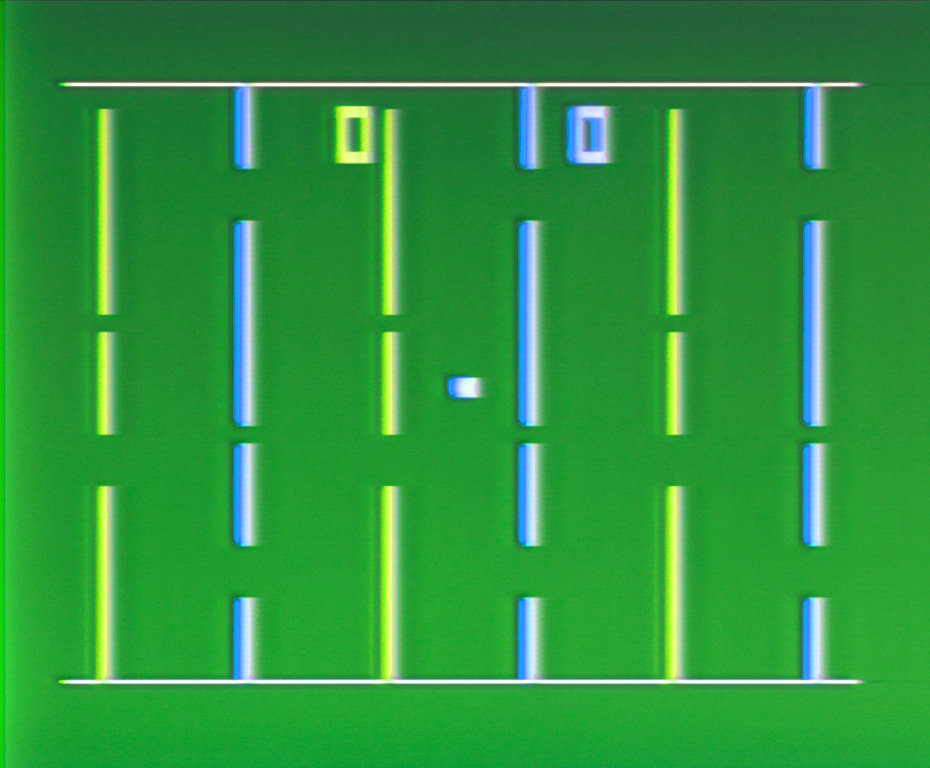
Hockey, tennis and gridball on an AY-3-8610 based game cartridge

The 10 selectable games for this chip included:

Game	No. of players
Tennis	2
Hockey/Soccer	2
Squash	2
Practice	1
Gridball	1
Basketball	2
Basketball practice	1
Two player target	2
Single player target	1

=== Usage ===
The AY-3-8610 featured a completely different pinout. It, too, required an external crystal oscillator. It still had separate video output pins, and removed the dedicated sync pin.

AY-3-8610

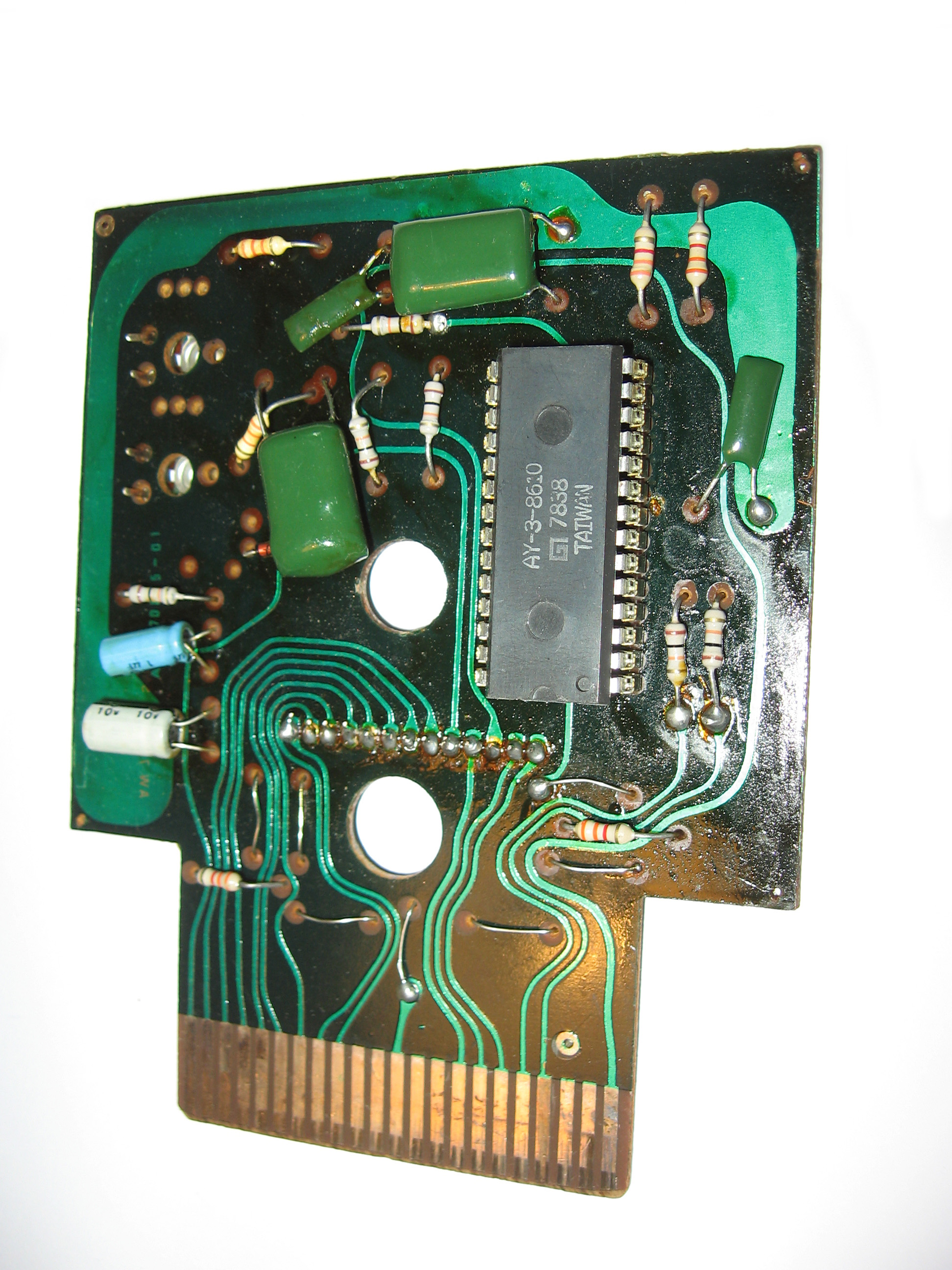
The inside of an AY-3-8610 based game cartridge. The console for which this was made accepted other cartridges. However, unlike modern consoles, the game chip, i.e. the core circuitry, was in the cartridge, not in the console.

=== Application ===
This is a list of consoles that use the AY-3-8610:

- Binatone TV-Master MK 8 e 10
- Grandstand Sports Centre 6000
- Match Color
- Telejogo II
- Universum Color Multi-Spiel 4010 e 4014
- Videomaster Sportsworld
- Hanimex TVG-8610
- Interstate 1110
- ITT/Ideal Tele-Match Cassette 2
- Polycon C 4016
- PC-50x Family
- Radofin Colour TV Game
- Radofin Tele-Sports III
- Saft-Leclanché TV 8 Sports
- TV 18 - 18 Spannende Videospiele C-4016
- TV 2018 Color - 18 Spannende Videospiele 441/2

Some consoles that use the AY-3-8600 chip:

- Coleco Telstar Galaxy
- Creatronic Bi.Bip 8
- Enterprex Color Home Video Game Apollo 2004
- Magnavox Odyssey 4000
- Philips Tele-Game ES 2218 Las Vegas
- Ricochet Electronic Ricochet 8
- Roberts Sportrama 8
- Unisonic Olympian 2600

== Derivatives ==
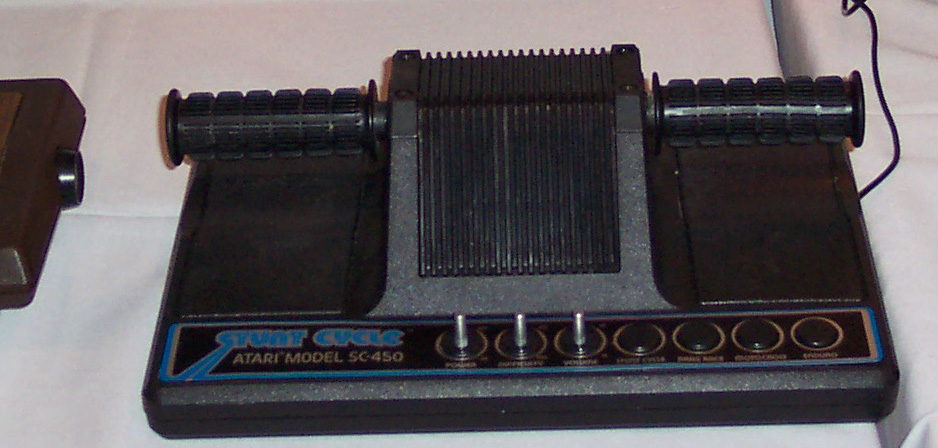
Atari console Stunt Cycle based on AY-3-8760

AY-3-8603 die

chip	Year	Derived from	DIP	Console	Note
AY-3-8510	1978	AY-3-8500	16 pin	Coleco Telstar Colortron	Four of six games of 8500 (no rifle/target games), with full colors
AY-3-8512	197?	AY-3-8500	16 pin	Coleco Telstar Marksman	The same as 8500 but with colors
AY-3-8700; AY-3-8710	1978		28 pin	Coleco Telstar Combat! PC-50x	Four combat games with tanks, 2 players
AY-3-8603	1978			PC-50x	Car race with vertical view. The car accelerate and the player must avoid collisions. 1 or 2 players
AY-3-8605	1978			PC-50x	Three games: a ship must fire torpedoes to hit submarines
AY-3-8606	1978			PC-50x	10 breakout games. 1 or 2 players
AY-3-8760 (8765 PAL)	1978			Atari Stunt Cycle; Sears Motocross; PC-50x	Motor-Cycle. Three game levels. A motorbike must jump over different objects (bus, etc.)
AY-3-8607	1978			PC-50x	4 games with an optical rifle. More than one difficult level
AY-3-8750	1978			Unreleased chip ?	Superspace. Space battle for two players

- An equivalent to the AY-3-8500 is the TMS1965NLA manufactured by Texas Instruments.
- The Soviet K145IK17 (Russian: К145ИК17) has a built-in counter, making it possible to use a momentary pushbutton instead of a multi-position switch to select games. The handicap game is not hidden, it can be chosen among others using this button. Since a pushbutton occupies only one pin, this IC has fewer pins.
- A competitor was the National Semiconductor MM57105.

== See also ==
- List of first generation home video game consoles
