= Unisonic Products Corporation =

American consumer electronics manufacturer and distributor

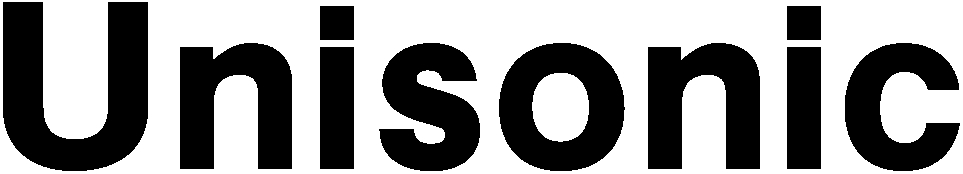
- Industry: Consumer electronics
- Headquarters: 1115 Broadway, New York City, United States
- Products: Calculators, CRT television sets, video game consoles, digital watches, telephones, answering machines, alarm clocks

Unisonic Products Corporation was an American manufacturer and distributor of consumer electronics from the 1970s to the 1990s. Although headquartered in New York City, Unisonic outsourced its manufacturing operations to various facilities in East Asia (especially in Hong Kong, South Korea, and Japan). Unisonic developed a variety of electronics, including calculators, CRT television sets, video game consoles, digital watches, telephones, answering machines, and digital alarm clocks.

In 1991, Franklin Electronic Publishers sued Unisonic Products Corporation for misleading advertising.

== Electronic game calculators ==
In the late 1970s and early 1980s, Unisonic released a series of digital calculators that featured a quartz clock and an electronic game. Among the calculators produced were Casino 7 and Mickey Mouse Space Quiz (model number FS-2024), both released in 1976, and 21 (model number 21-P1B), which was released in 1977 and featured a blackjack game. Casino 7 and 21 each employed a vacuum fluorescent display (VFD), whereas Mickey Mouse Space Quiz used two light-emitting diodes (LEDs), one green and one red, to indicate correct and incorrect quiz answers, respectively.

== Foray into the video game console market ==
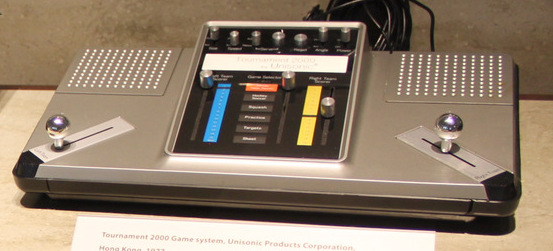
Tournament 2000 game system

Like dozens of other manufacturers of consumer electronics, Unisonic released a series of dedicated consoles in the late 1970s. The consoles were generally patterned on Home Pong, a game console released by Atari, Inc. in 1975. Unisonic released its first console in 1976: the Unisonic Sportsman T101, which featured four selectable video games, two linear paddle controllers, and a light gun. Unisonic followed the Sportsman with a series of variations through 1976 and 1977, all for the US market.

As was the case with most "Pong clones" of the 1970s, Unisonic's Sportsman and Tournament consoles were driven by General Instrument's AY-3-8500-001, an integrated circuit containing seven video games. The Unisonic consoles models not featuring a light gun offered a subset of these, consisting of four games: Practice, Squash, Hockey, and Tennis. The Tournament 150 was the first Unisonic console equipped with the light gun accessory, and with it Unisonic introduced two additional games: Skeet and Target.

In 1978 the company released its last pong console: the Olympian 2600, which featured ten games and "omnidirectional" joysticks. It is based on the AY-3-8600 pong chip with the addition of colors thanks to the AY-3-8615.

In 1978 Unisonic released the Champion 2711 console. This is the only product known to be based on the Gimini "Mid-Range 8950" reference design by General Instrument. Like the Mattel Intellivision, which is based on the more powerful General Instrument Gimini "Full Range 8900" reference design, the Champion 2711 is built around the 16-bit CP-1610 CPU, but the Mid-Range chip-set makes use of a simple, combined display and sound chip, the GIC AY-3-8800, which can only generate white upper-case alphanumeric text and coloured playing card symbols on a vertically split, two resolution, green playing field. These idiosyncrasies make it challenging to write compelling programs, other than card games, for the machine. The firmware within the console contains two built-in games, Blackjack and Baccarat, and a further four cartridges, known as PACs, were released for the system. Three of these cartridges contain additional card games, including variations on Poker, Mastermind and Concentration; the fourth PAC is an edutainment title called Arithmetic Primer. The system was produced in low quantities and was sold in the US, and from the start of 1979 in Japan, where it was branded as the "Casino TV Games". As a consequence of its commercial failure and limited production run, the Champion 2711 is now very rare.

Atari, Inc., which released the Atari Video Computer System in North America some months prior to the Olympian 2600's street date, went on to dominate the video game console market in North America until the video game crash of 1983.

| Model name | Model number | Year of release | Number of selectable games | Light gun | Manufactured in | Integrated circuit(s) |
|---|---|---|---|---|---|---|
| Sportsman T101 | T101 | 1976 | 4 | No | Hong Kong | AY-3-8500 |
| Tournament 100 | T100 | 1976 | 4 | No | Hong Kong | AY-3-8500 |
| Tournament 102 | T102 | 1976 | 3 | No | Hong Kong | ? |
| Tournament 150 | T150 | 1976 | 6 | Yes | Hong Kong | AY-3-8500 |
| Tournament 200 | ? | 1976 | 4 | No | Hong Kong | AY-3-8500 |
| Tournament 1000 | T-1000 | 1977 | 4 | No | Hong Kong | AY-3-8500 |
| Tournament 2000 | T2000-JR | 1977 | 6 | Yes | Japan | AY-3-8500 |
| Tournament 2501 | ? | 1977 | 6 | Yes | ? | AY-3-8500 |
| Olympian 2600 | ? | 1978 | 10 | Yes | Japan | AY-3-8600; AY-3-8615 (color) |
| Champion 2711 | ? | 1978 | 2^{a} | No | ? | CP-1610 (CPU); AY-3-8800 (video and sound) |

1. Also accepts cartridges. Four titles were marketed: Arithmetic Primer, Family Cards, Family Fun, and Poker Games.

== See also ==
- Telstar (game console)
- Nelsonic Industries
