= Ping-O-Tronic =

Home video game console by Zanussi

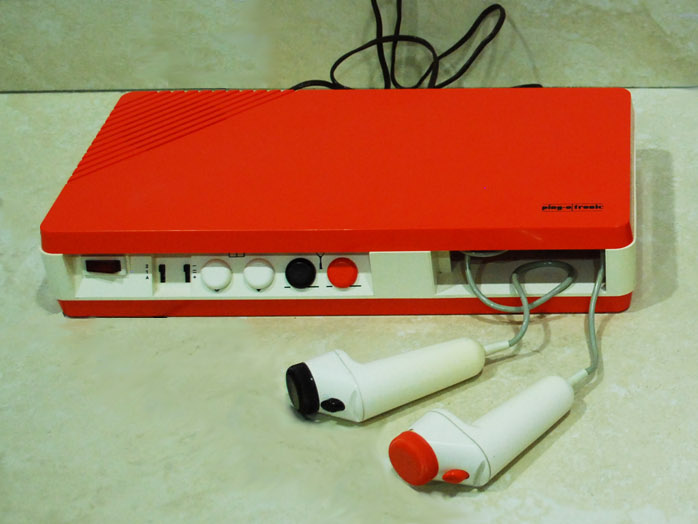
- A Zanussi Ping-O-Tronic with its two paddle-based game controllers
- Also known as: Zanussi Ping-O-Tronic Séleco Ping-O-Tronic
- Manufacturer: Zanussi
- Type: Dedicated home video game console
- Generation: First generation
- Released: Late 1974
- Availability: Late 1974
- Lifespan: 1974-1983
- Introductory price: Estimated 70.000–130.000 Italian lira (Play-O-Tronic)
- Units sold: c. 1 million with Play-O-Tronic (as of 1983)
- Predecessor: None
- Successor: Play-O-Tronic

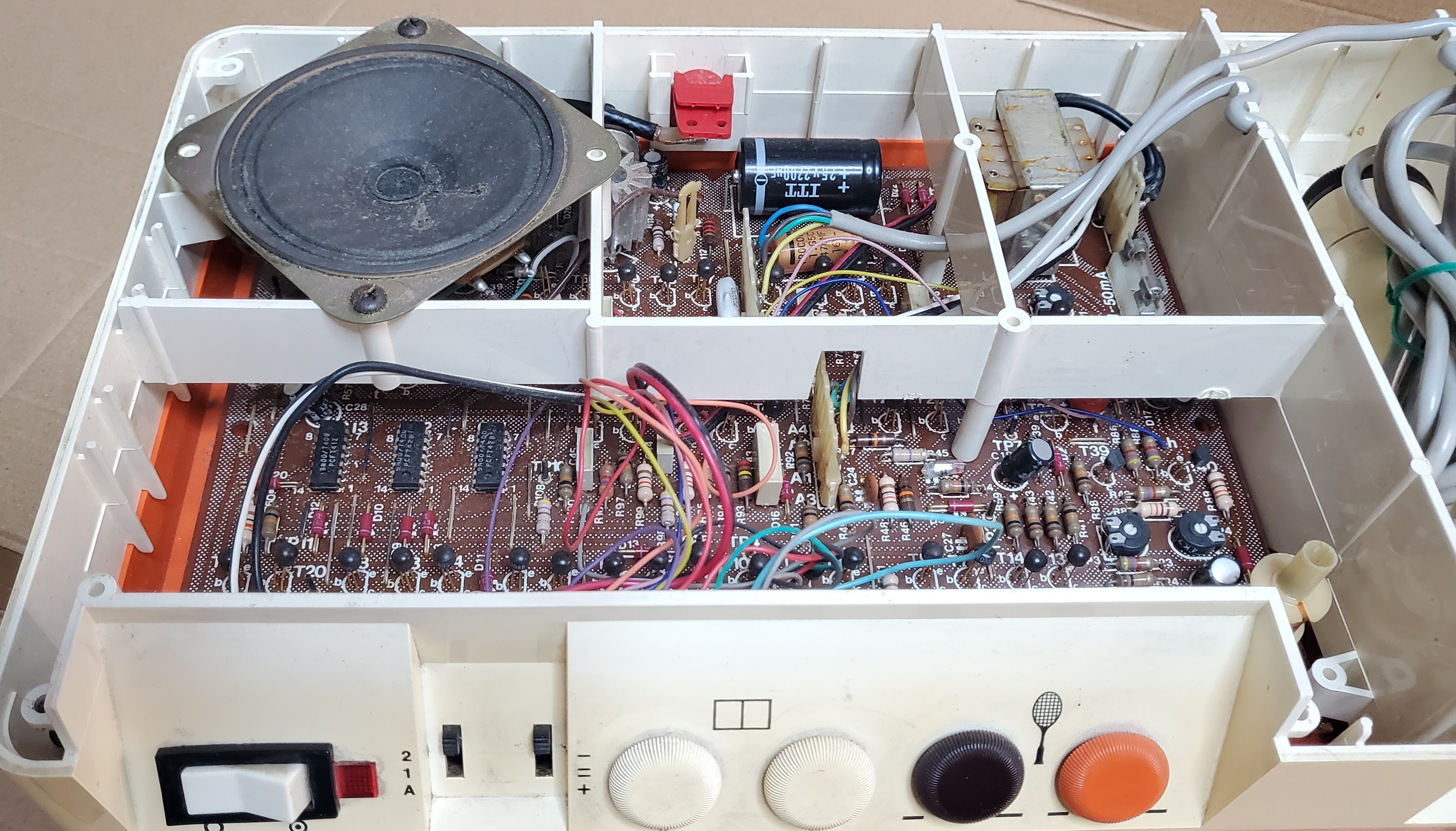
Interior of a Ping-O-Tronic

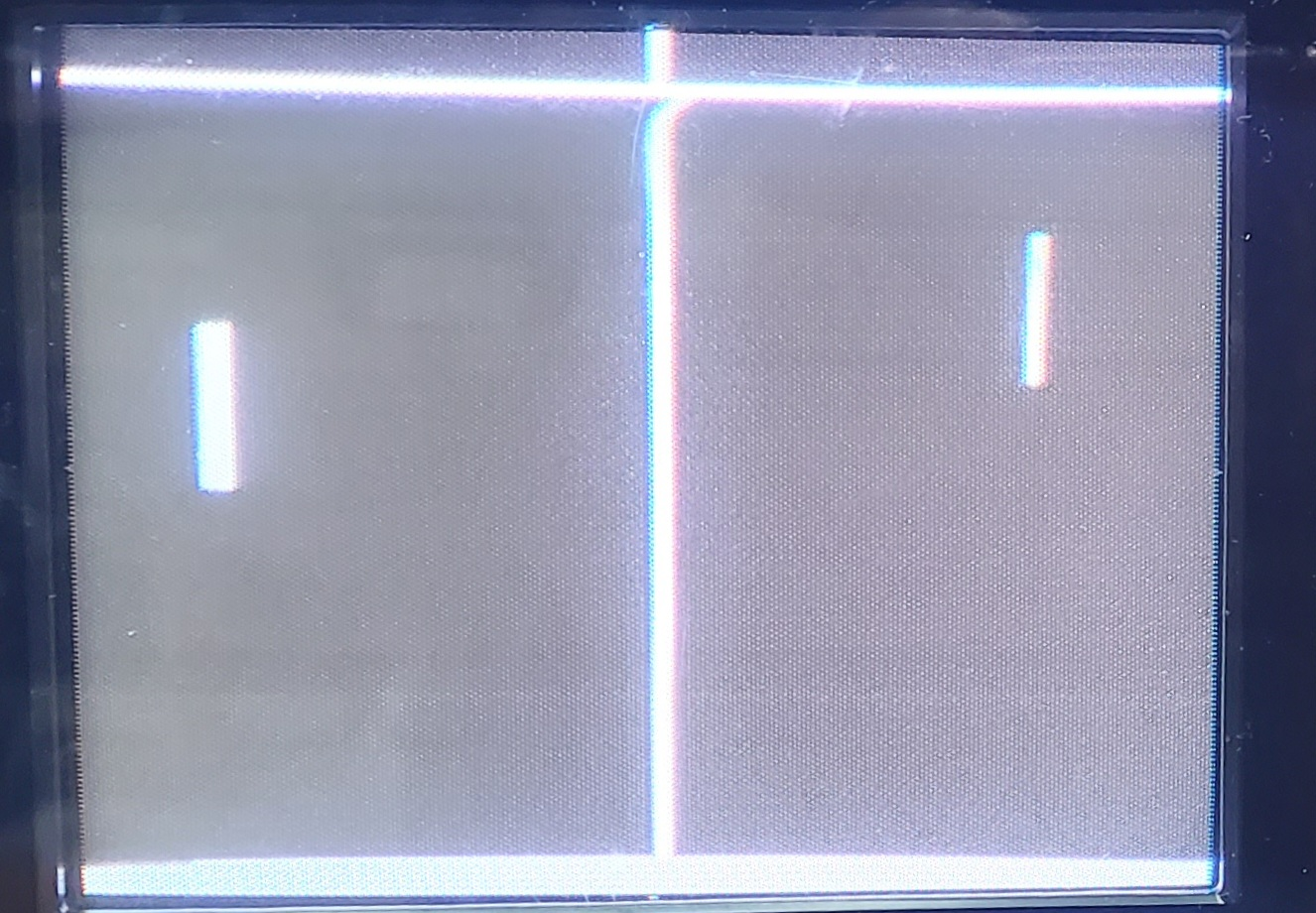
Gameplay of the Ping-O-Tronic

The Ping-O-Tronic (stylized on its logo as ping·o·tronic and also known as Zanussi Ping-O-Tronic or Sèleco Ping-O-Tronic) is a dedicated first-generation home video game console produced by Zanussi, an Italian home appliance company, and released under their Sèleco brand in late-1974 only in Italy. It was the first Italian video game console, excluding Magnavox Odyssey imports and clones.

The Ping-O-Tronic came in an orange and white plastic container with a paddles housing. The control logic is based on three 7400 chips. Usable games are only three similar ones: Pong, Squash/Solo and Automatic/Attract. The last one was the only game that did not require players and was used by stores to demonstrate the system without having anyone play it.

There are several versions of the Ping-O-Tronic, marked by the abbreviations PP-1 up to PP-10. Starting from the PP-5, there was a new slot to which an optical gun could be connected to play a new aiming game. This accessory is called Gun-O-Tronic (stylized as gun·o·tronic). The only other known consoles at the time which allowed the user to play aiming games were the Magnavox Odyssey and Philips Tele-Game ES 2201.

On April 21, 1975, Zanussi obtained the license to implement Pong from Sanders Associates.

== Play-O-Tronic ==
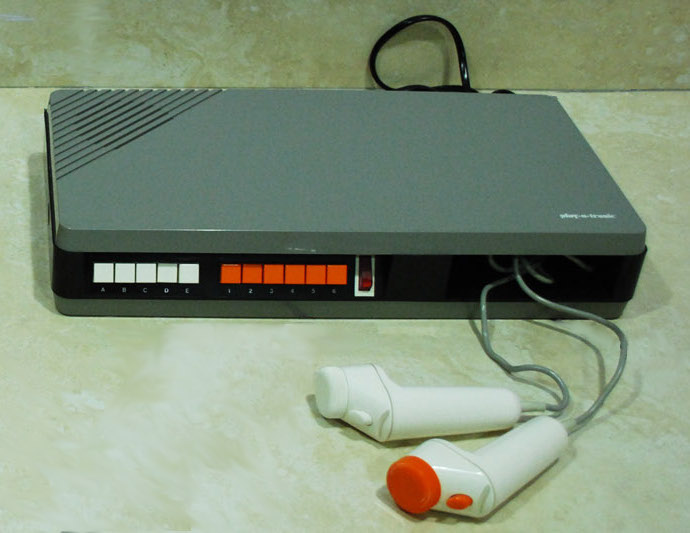
Play-O-Tronic

In 1977, Zanussi produced and sold a new model of a Pong-like console called Play-O-Tronic (stylized as play·o·tronic and also known as Zanussi Play-O-Tronic or Sèleco Play-O-Tronic). Unlike the Ping-O-Tronic, which was built with discrete components, the Play-O-Tronic was built from a single AY-3-8500 chip.

The console was also sold in Germany by German mailorder company Quelle, who sold the console under the name Universum TV Multi-Spiel (stylized as UNIVERSUM TV Multi-Spiel). A built-in power supply comes with the Multi-Spiel.

== Sales ==
Zanussi was reported to have sold 21,514 units of the Play-O-Tronic from October 1 to December 31, 1977, and earned a total of 620,408,000 Italian lira (US$127,782,334), of which 5.5%, 34,122,440 lira (US$7,028,028) went to Sanders Associates.
