= Ameprod Television Game 10 =

Home video game console by PPZ Ameprod

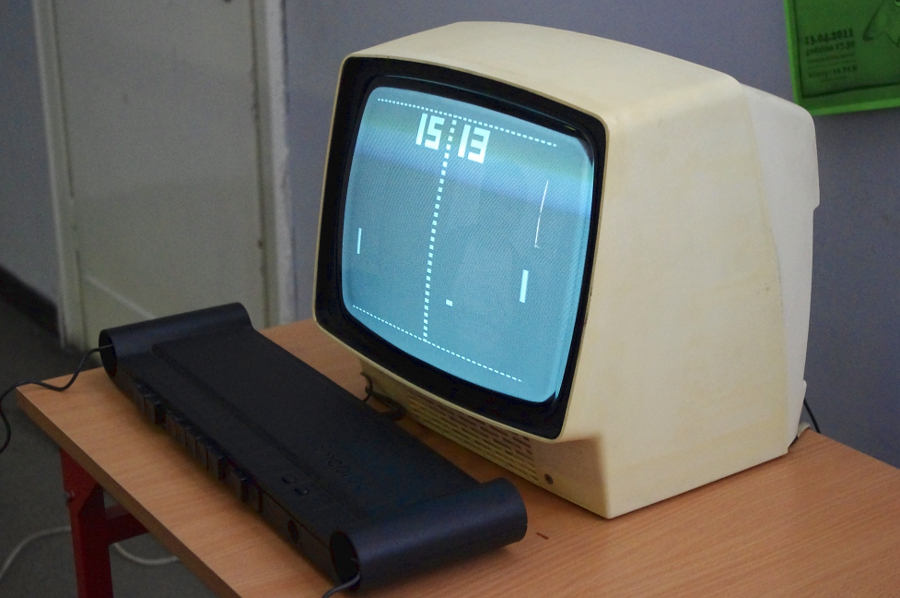
- An Ameprod TVG-10 connected to a Neptun 150 TV set.
- Also known as: Ameprod TVG-10 (abbreviation)
- Developer: PPZ Ameprod
- Manufacturer: Elwro (1978–1981); PPZ Ameprod (1981–1984)
- Type: Dedicated home video game console
- Generation: First generation
- Released: 1980
- Units sold: c. 100,000
- CPU: AY-3-8500

The Ameprod Television Game 10 (officially abbreviated as Ameprod TVG-10) is a dedicated first-generation home video game console that was produced in Poland by Elwro from 1978 to 1981. In 1981, the production was transferred to PPZ Ameprod. In 1980, the system was released by PPZ Ameprod. In the first three years, about 10,000 consoles were sold. In 1984, the production ended and about 100,000 Ameprod TVG-10 consoles were sold.

The TVG-10 featured six integrated games, of which without the separately available lightgun called Videotraf only four games were playable.

== History ==
After the emergence of the AY-3-8500 chipset in the Nichtsozialistisches Wirtschaftsgebiet (NSW) in 1976, there were also considerations in Poland to produce such a consumer good. First attempts made the company Unimor in the 1970s. Two prototypes were produced, the Unimor GTV-881 tele-set and the GEM-1 from Elzab. Of these, only one was ready for the market and was produced in very small numbers (less than 1,000). Some electronic journals also published blueprints for the reader to build his own Pong console. These were all based on logic modules. Later, in Poland, the AY-3-8500 from General Instrument was finally legally acquired by the Federal Republic of Germany to build the TVG-10. Elwro began production of the TVG-10 in 1979, the console was available in 1980 in the radio and television departments in Poland. In the console, thanks to the AY-3-8500 chip, six fixed built-in games (Pong, Soccer, Squash, Practice and 2 shooting games) are preinstalled. The device was very expensive for the private customer and only about 10,000 units were sold in the first 3 years. In 1981, PPZ Ameprod took over the production. With this legal form, it was possible to obtain larger quantities of chips at better conditions, which allowed the increase in production numbers.

The production of the system ended in 1984. In total, approximately 100,000 units of the TVG-10 were manufactured and sold.

== Hardware ==
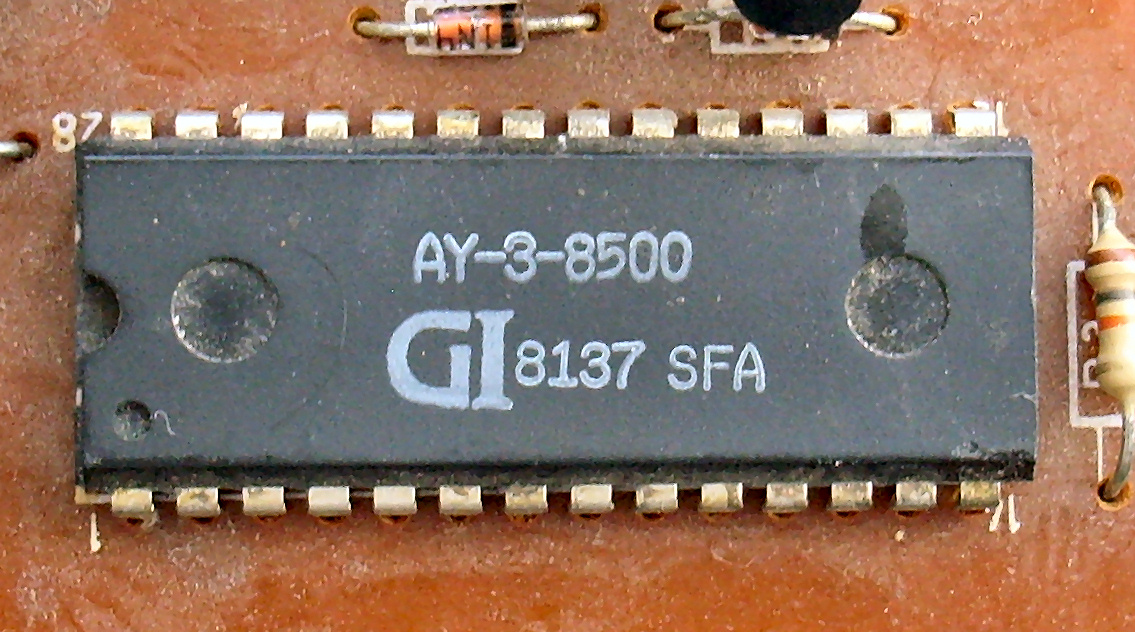
The AY-3-8500 chipset from General Instrument used in the TVG-10

- Chipset: AY-3-8500 chipset
- Weight: ca. 2 kilograms (4.4 lb)
- Dimensions ca. 3 by 47 by 15 centimetres (1.2 in × 18.5 in × 5.9 in) (height x width x depth)
- Voltage: 220 V
- Picture: monochrome, 50 Hz
- Input: 4 W
