= TV Scoreboard =

Home video game console by Tandy

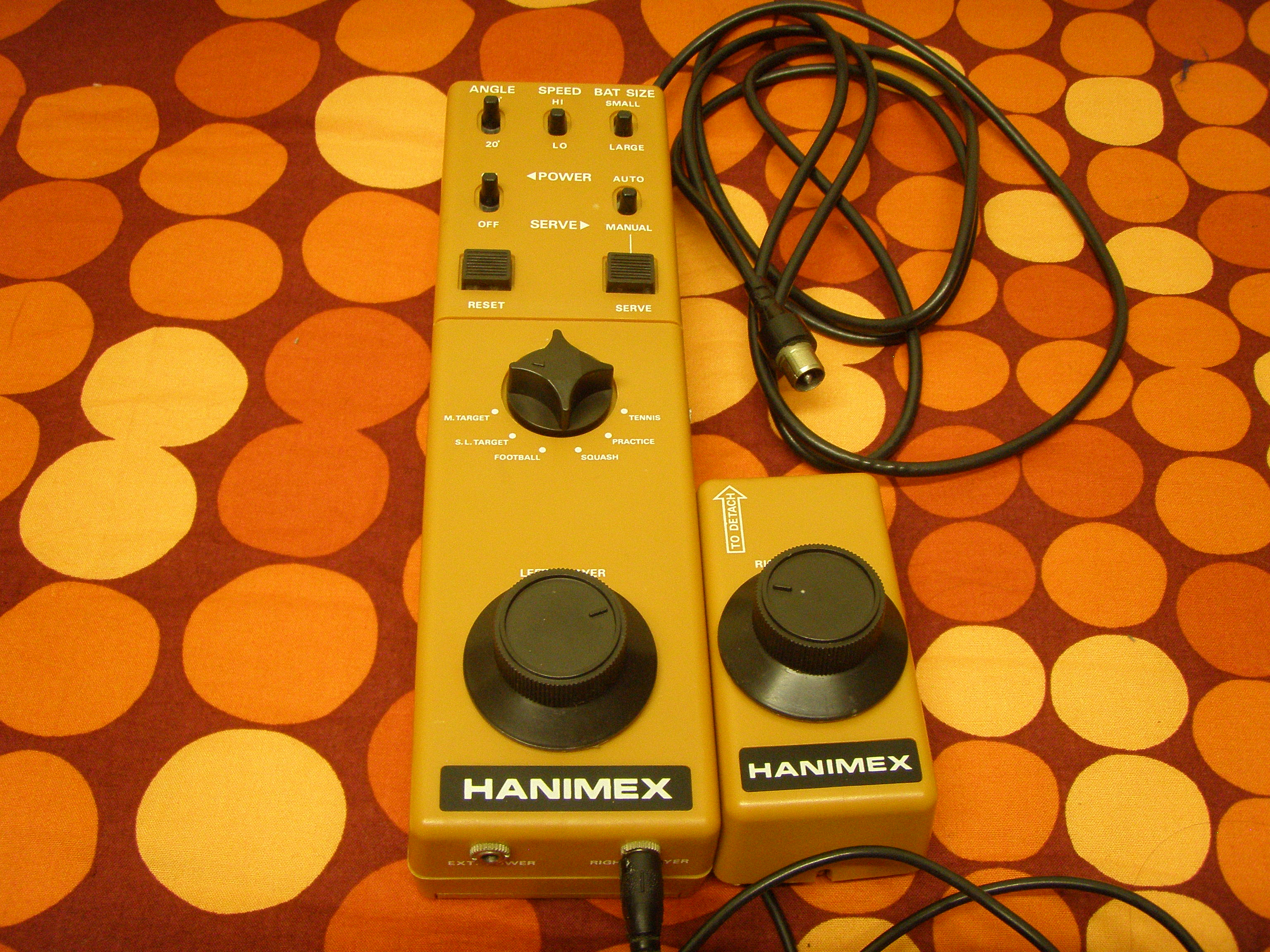
- Controller of the TV Scoreboard (introduced in 1978)
- Also known as: RadioShack TV Scoreboard
- Developer: Tandy
- Manufacturer: RadioShack
- Type: Dedicated home video game console
- Generation: First generation
- Released: 1976
- CPU: General Instruments AY-3-8500
- Controller input: External Controllers were introduced in 1978. When introduced in 1976 there were two sliders on the console itself to move the paddle.
- Power: AC adapter or 6 x 1.5v AA battery

The TV Scoreboard (sometimes called RadioShack TV Scoreboard) is a Pong-like dedicated home video game console manufactured in Hong Kong from 1976 through the early '80s and made by Tandy. Distribution was handled exclusively by RadioShack.

The TV Scoreboard consisted of a left and right player, with dials or paddles on the hand held piece, and had multiple Pong era games. A variant also included a revolver-type light gun, which was used for a clay pigeon shooting game. Using additional cosmetic attachments to the light gun, the user could change its appearance to be that of a rifle. The games included but were not restricted to tennis, squash, hockey and practice. Games and game modes, including difficulty settings and serving settings, could be adjusted with switches. It ran on either an AC adapter, or six 1.5 V AA batteries.

The console belongs to the first generation of video game console and is based on one single chip, the General Instrument AY-3-8500.

== Versions ==
The system was also released in Germany under the name Universum Multispiel in 1977. Another very similar console is the 677 released in 1978 by Hanimex.

== Games ==
The following ten games are playable with the system:

- Tennis
- Football
- Squash
- Practice (Pelota)
- Target
- Motorcycle
- Enduro
- Motocross
- Stunt Cycle
- Drag Race
