= Philips Tele-Game series =

Series of first-generation home video game consoles

- Type: Series of dedicated home video game consoles
- Generation: First generation
- Lifespan: Late 1975–1978
- Introductory price: ES 2201: 150 DM (converted 61 Euro)/400 Franc
- Power: ES 2208 Las Vegas: 9 V DC power supply
- Weight: ES 2208 Las Vegas: c. 800 g
- Predecessor: Philips Odyssey series
- Successor: Philips Videopac G7000

The Philips Tele-Game series is a series of five dedicated first-generation home video game consoles plus 1 more manufactured, released and marketed between 1975 and 1978 by Dutch company Philips.

All Philips Tele-Game consoles have the contraction "ES" which stands for "elektronisches Spiel" (German for "electronic game"). The systems are named differently depending on the country (Tele-Spiel in Germany, Tele-Game in the United Kingdom, Tele-Peli in Finland, and Tele-Spel in the Netherlands). In all countries, the name means tele game. The Philips Tele-Game consoles were some of the first European video game consoles ever to be released.

== Models ==
=== ES 2201 ===
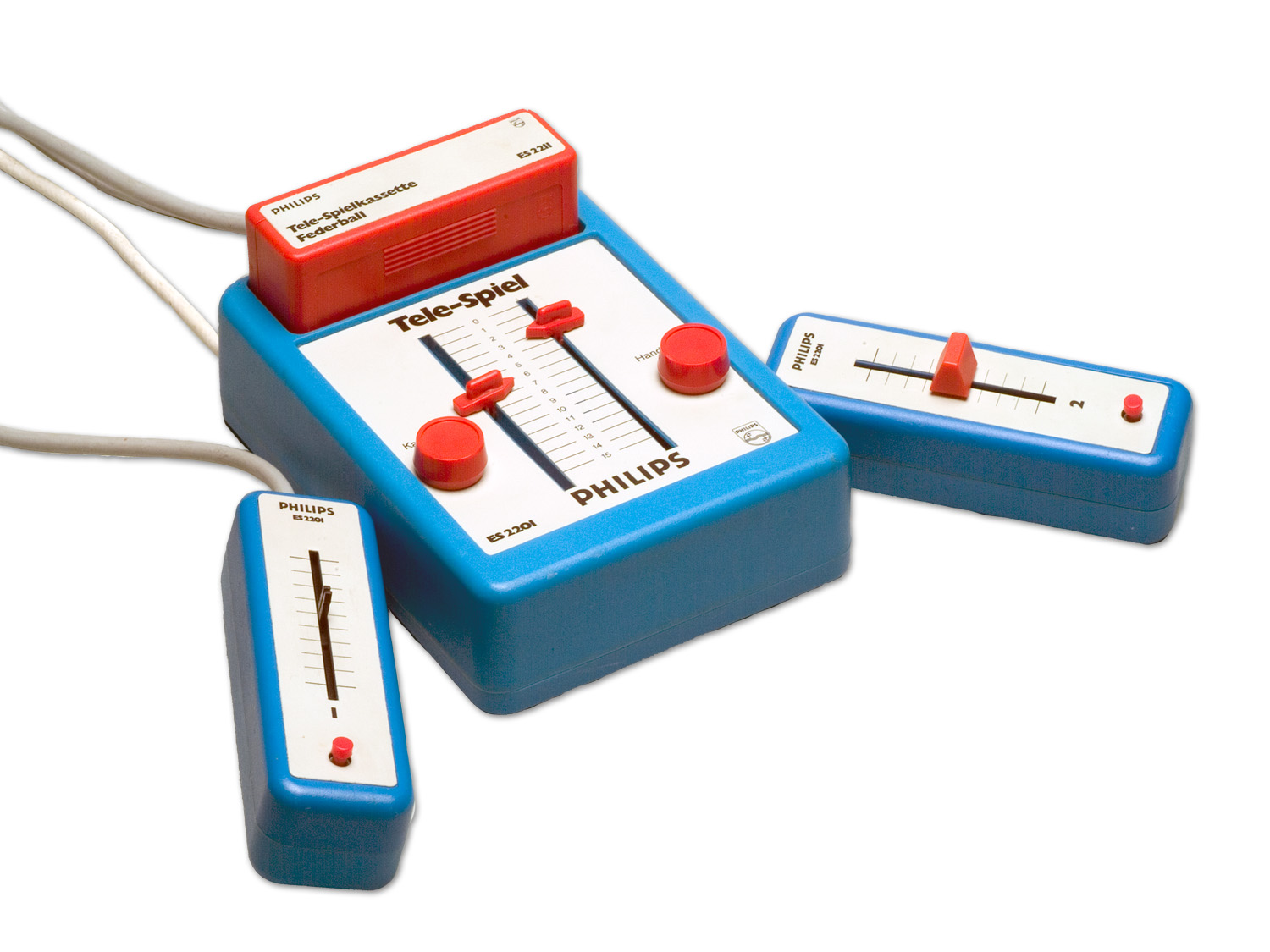
Philips Tele-Spiel ES 2201

The Philips Tele-Game ES 2201 was the first console of the Philips Tele-Game series and was sold from late 1975 to 1976 for 150 Deutsche Mark (DM) (converted 61 Euro) or 400 Franc. The score is not displayed on screen, hence there are two sliders for the score on the case ranging from 0 to 15. It can only output black and white like most systems at the time.It used slider controllers with a button.

==== Games ====
Games available for the Philips Tele-Game ES-2201
Nr.	English name	German name	Cartridge model
1	Badminton	Federball	ES-2211
2	Pelota	Trainingswand	ES-2212
3	Skeet Shooting	Tontaubenschiessen	ES-2213
4	Racing	Autoslalom	ES-2214
5	Ghostchaser	Phantomjagd	ES-2215

Five games were available for the system: Badminton, Pelota, Skeet Shooting, Racing and Ghostchaser. All of those games (except Badminton which was in the delivery) were sold for 25 DM or 45 Franc. On these cartridges wasn't CPU or rom based, there are just discrete logic parts that it makes a game. When the game is being played its shown like most systems from the 70s.

=== ES 2203 Las Vegas ===
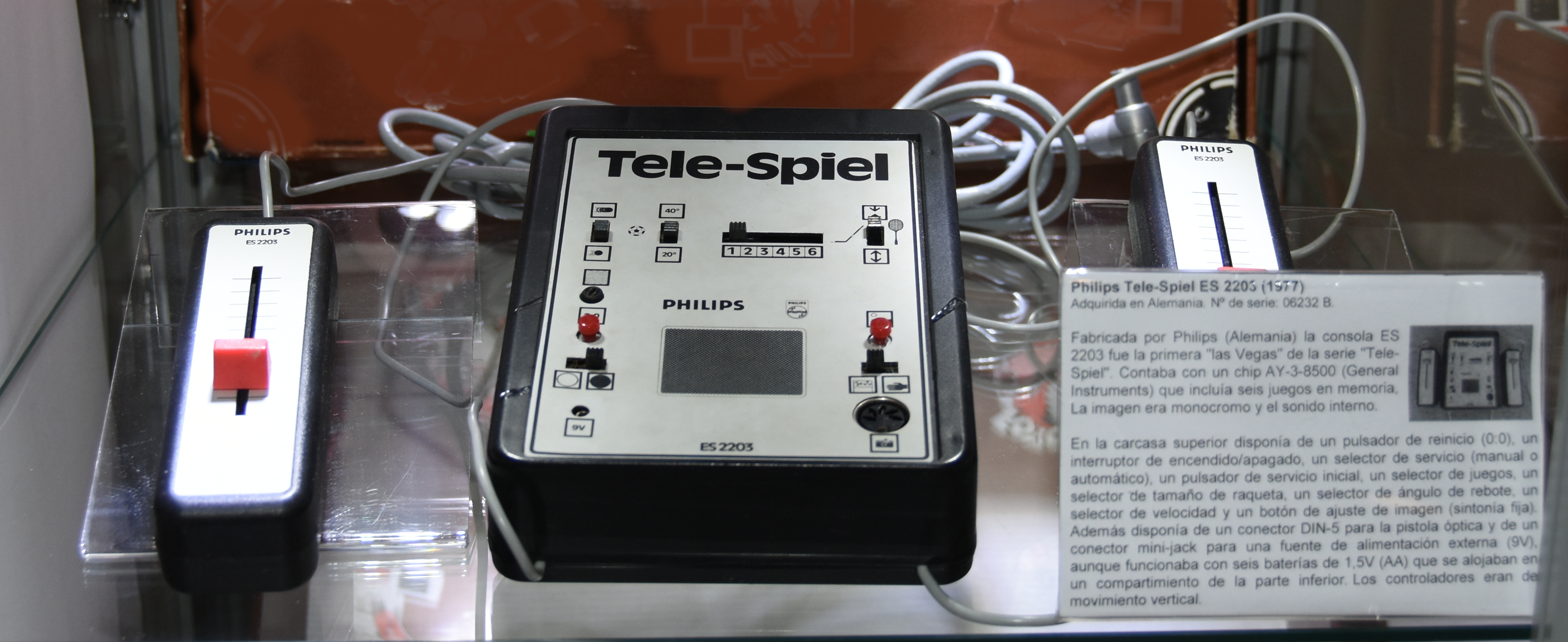
Philips Tele-Spiel 2203 in packaging

The Philips Tele-Game ES 2203 Las Vegas is the second console in the Philips Tele-Game series. It was released in 1977 and has six integrated games instead of four commercially available games through the built-in Pong video game circuit AY-3-8500; Pong, soccer, squash, practice and two shooting games that can be played with a separately available light gun. Otherwise, the device is identical to the previous console ES 2201. The console was not a success due to its high price, which is why it was later reissued with the Philips Tele-Game ES 2207 Travemünde in a cheaper version in the same year.

=== ES 2204 Las Vegas ===
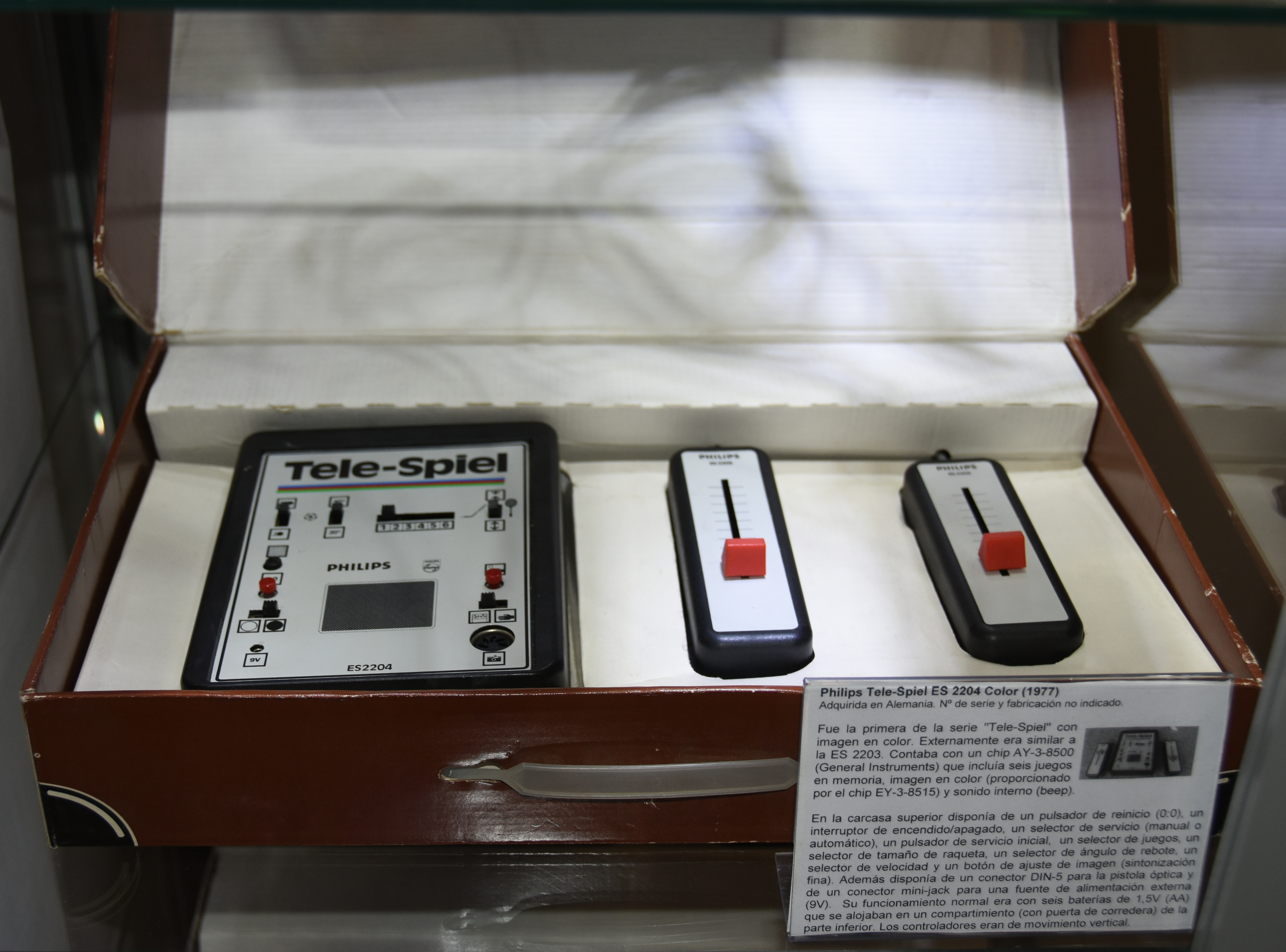
Philips Tele-Spiel 2204 in packaging

The Philips Tele-Game ES 2204 Las Vegas, released in 1977, is the third console in the series and uses an AY-3-8500. Otherwise the system is identical to the model ES 2203.

=== ES 2207 Travemünde ===
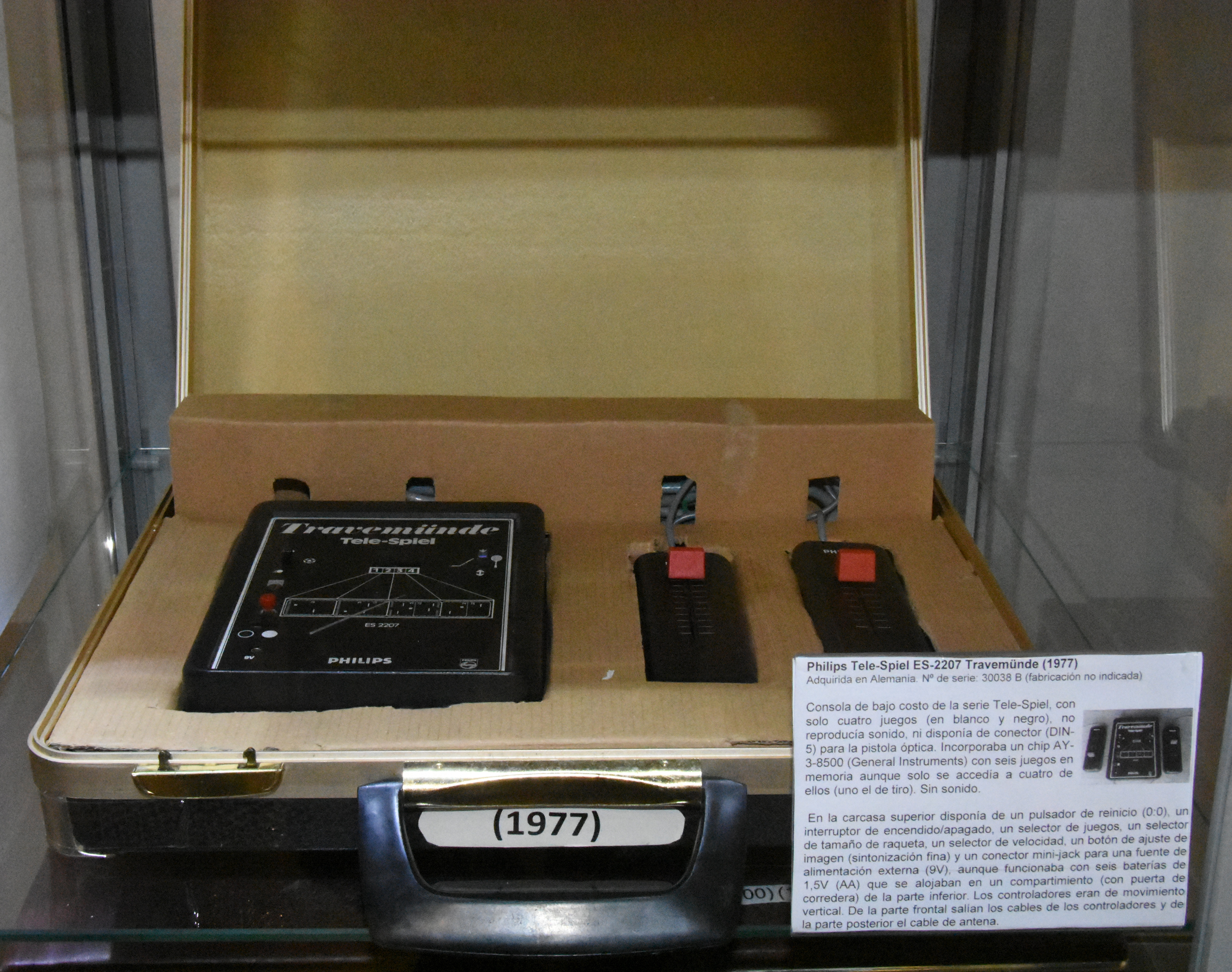
Philips Tele-Spiel 2207 in packaging

The Philips Tele-Game ES 2207 Travemünde is a cheaper newer edition of the ES 2203. It was released in 1977 and also uses an AY-3-8500. It is powered by a power supply (7,6 V/260 mA).

=== ES 2208 Las Vegas ===
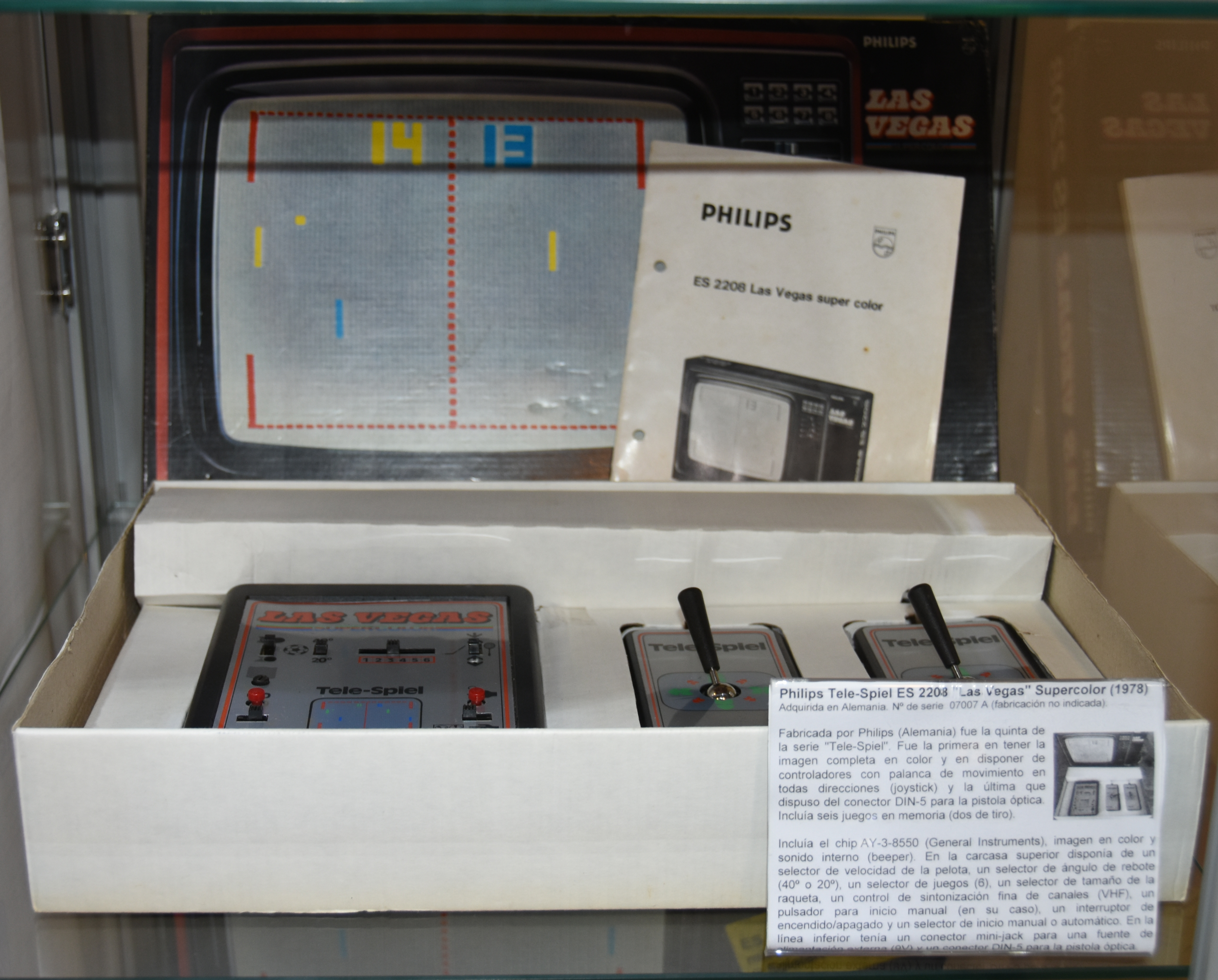
Philips Tele-Spiel 2208 in packaging

The Philips Tele-Game ES 2208 Las Vegas is the fifth console in the Philips Tele-Game series and was released in 1977. For the first time, the system's joysticks offer 2-dimensional instead of 1-dimensional movements. It uses an AY-3-8550 and therefore can output color and has a mass of ca. 800 g. It is powered by a 9 V DC power supply. Otherwise, the system is identical to the model ES 2204.

=== ES 2218 Las Vegas ===
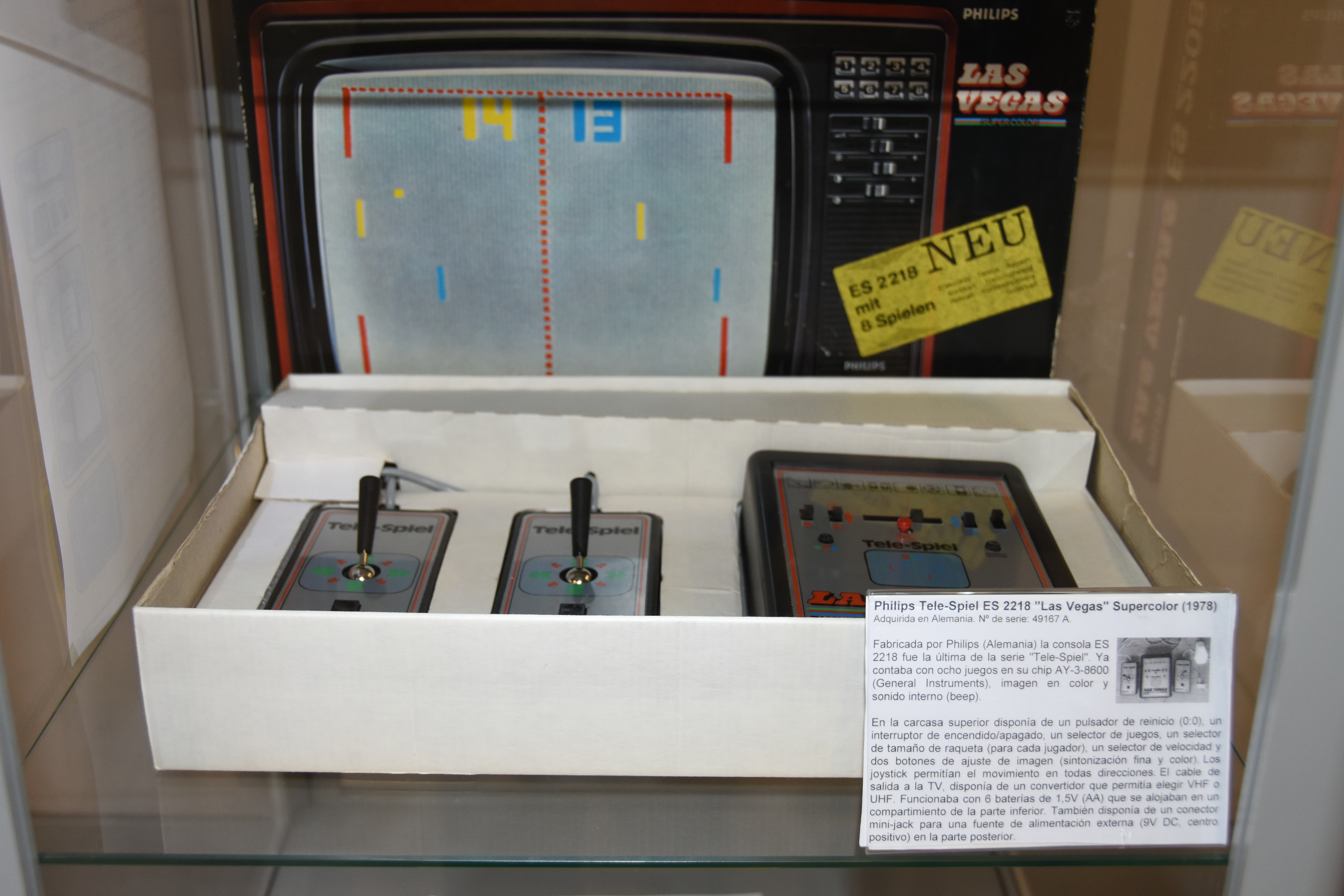
Philips Tele-Spiel 2218 in packaging

The Philips Tele-Game ES 2218 Las Vegas is the sixth and last console in the Philips Tele-Game series. It was released in 1977. For the first time, it offers eight instead of just six integrated games. The device is otherwise identical to the model ES 2208 Las Vegas, with the only difference that it has an integrated AY-3-8600 chip. This console was also available as a self-building kit with the designation EB 7601.
