= Star Trek: Phaser Strike =

1979 video game

- Developer: Milton Bradley
- Publisher: Milton Bradley
- Platform: Microvision
- Release: November 1979
- Genre: Shoot 'em up
- Mode: Single player

Star Trek: Phaser Strike is a shoot 'em up video game that was published by Milton Bradley in 1979, and released for the Microvision at the same time as the film Star Trek: The Motion Picture. In the game, the player must destroy ships with phaser banks located at the bottom of the screen. The Star Trek name was later dropped and the game was sold as Phaser Strike. It was sold under other names internationally: Shooting Star in West Germany, Italy and the UK, and Cannon Phaser in France and Canada.

== Gameplay ==
Three phaser banks are placed at the bottom of the screen enabling the player to shoot in three separate directions at spaceships represented by a collection of blocks. Although the game is entitled Phaser Strike, the game manual refers to the projectiles as missiles. The size, ranging from one to four squares, and speed of movement of the ships are pre-selected as part of the difficulty settings by the player. In addition to allowing the player to specify the size and speed, the "changeable" option has the console randomly assigning those settings on a ship by ship basis. The player is also able to choose the number of ships that will appear, in multiples of 10 up to 90; the game ends after all the ships have been launched. A score is then generated and the player is given the option to start a new game.

== Release ==
Star Trek: Phaser Strike was released in November 1979 by Milton Bradley for the Microvision hand-held game system alongside the film Star Trek: The Motion Picture, and as one of seven launch titles for the console. This made it the first home console video game release for the Star Trek franchise. The package came with a game cartridge overlay for the base unit along with an instruction manual. After Milton Bradley lost the license during the following year, a new non-Star Trek related version was released, simply called Phaser Strike. Internationally it was sold without the Star Trek license at all; in Italy and German it was called Shooting Star and in France and Canada, it was titled Cannon Phaser.
