= Sea Duel =

1980 video game

- Developer: Milton Bradley
- Publisher: Milton Bradley
- Platform: Microvision
- Release: 1980
- Genre: Strategy
- Modes: Single-player, multiplayer

Sea Duel is a video game for the Microvision handheld console. It was released as part of the second wave of Microvision games in 1980. The box describes it as "Naval Battle of Wits."

== Gameplay ==
Sea Duel is a turn-based strategy game. The player chooses to play as a ship or a submarine. The objective of the ship is to hit the sub with depth charges. The objective of the sub is to torpedo the ship. The game can be played by one player versus the computer, or by two players versus each other. The player(s) plots the moves and firing pattern, and then the scenario plays itself out. The player with the most hits by the end of each round is the winner.
