= Microvision =

First handheld game console that used interchangeable ROM cartridges

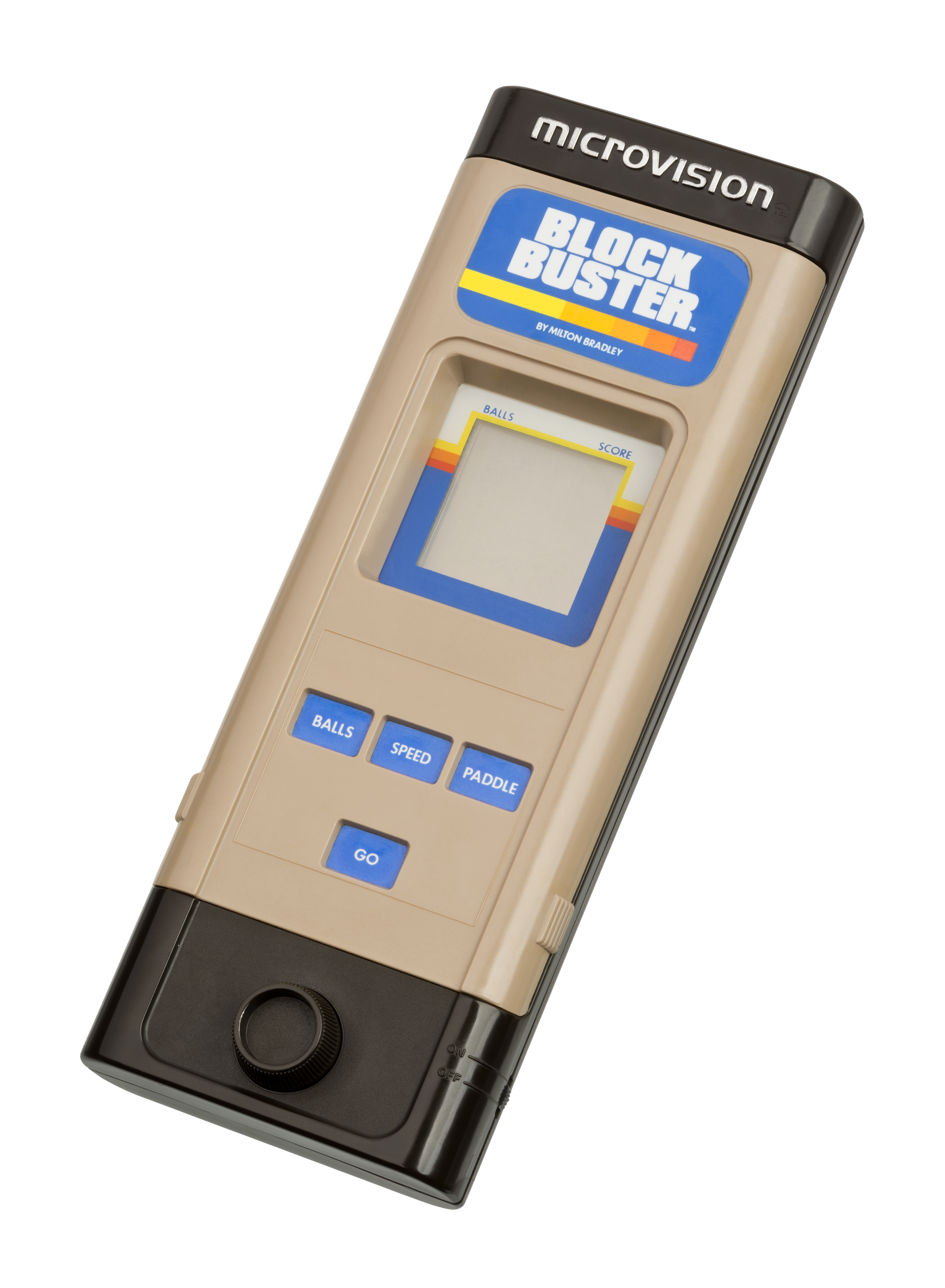
- A Microvision with Block Buster cartridge inserted
- Also known as: Milton Bradley Microvision; MB Microvision
- Manufacturer: Milton Bradley Company
- Type: Handheld game console
- Generation: Second generation
- Released: November 1979; 47 years ago
- Introductory price: US$49.99 (equivalent to about $222 in 2025)
- Discontinued: 1981
- Media: ROM cartridges
- CPU: Intel 8021/TI TMS1100 (on cartridge) clocked at 100 kHz
- Memory: 64 bytes RAM, 2K ROM
- Display: 16 × 16 pixels resolution
- Power: 1 × 9V battery (TMS1100 processors), 2 × 9V battery (Intel 8021 processors)

The Microvision (aka Milton Bradley Microvision or MB Microvision) is the first handheld game console that used interchangeable cartridges and in that sense is reprogrammable. It was released by the Milton Bradley Company in November 1979 for a retail price of $49.99, equivalent to $221.00 in 2025.

The Microvision was designed by Jay Smith, the engineer who later designed the Vectrex video game console. The Microvision's combination of portability and a cartridge-based system led to moderate success, with Smith Engineering grossing $15 million in the first year of the system's release. However, its small game library, its small screen, and a lack of support from established home video game companies led to its discontinuation in 1981. According to Satoru Okada, the former head of Nintendo's R&D1 Department, the Microvision inspired the Game Boy, the follow-up to Game & Watch, after Nintendo designed around Microvision's limitations.

== Production ==
Screenshot of Block Buster, which came packaged with the Microvision

Unlike most later consoles, the Microvision did not contain an onboard processor (CPU). Instead, each game included its own processor contained within the removable cartridge. This meant that the console itself effectively consisted of the controls, LCD panel and LCD controller.

The processors for the first Microvision cartridges were made with both Intel 8021 (cross-licensed by Signetics) and Texas Instruments TMS1100 processors. Due to purchasing issues, Milton Bradley switched to using TMS1100 processors exclusively, including reprogramming the games that were originally programmed for the 8021 processor. The TMS1100 was a more primitive device, but offered more memory and lower power consumption than the 8021. First-revision Microvisions needed two batteries due to the 8021's higher power consumption, but later units (designed for the TMS1100) only had one active battery holder. Even though the battery compartment was designed to allow the two 9-volt batteries to be inserted with proper polarity of positive and negative terminals, when a battery was forcefully improperly oriented, while the other battery was properly oriented, the two batteries would be shorted and overheat. The solution was to remove terminals for one of the batteries to prevent this hazard. Due to the high cost of changing production molds, Milton Bradley did not eliminate the second battery compartment, but instead removed its terminals and called it a spare battery holder.

== Problems ==
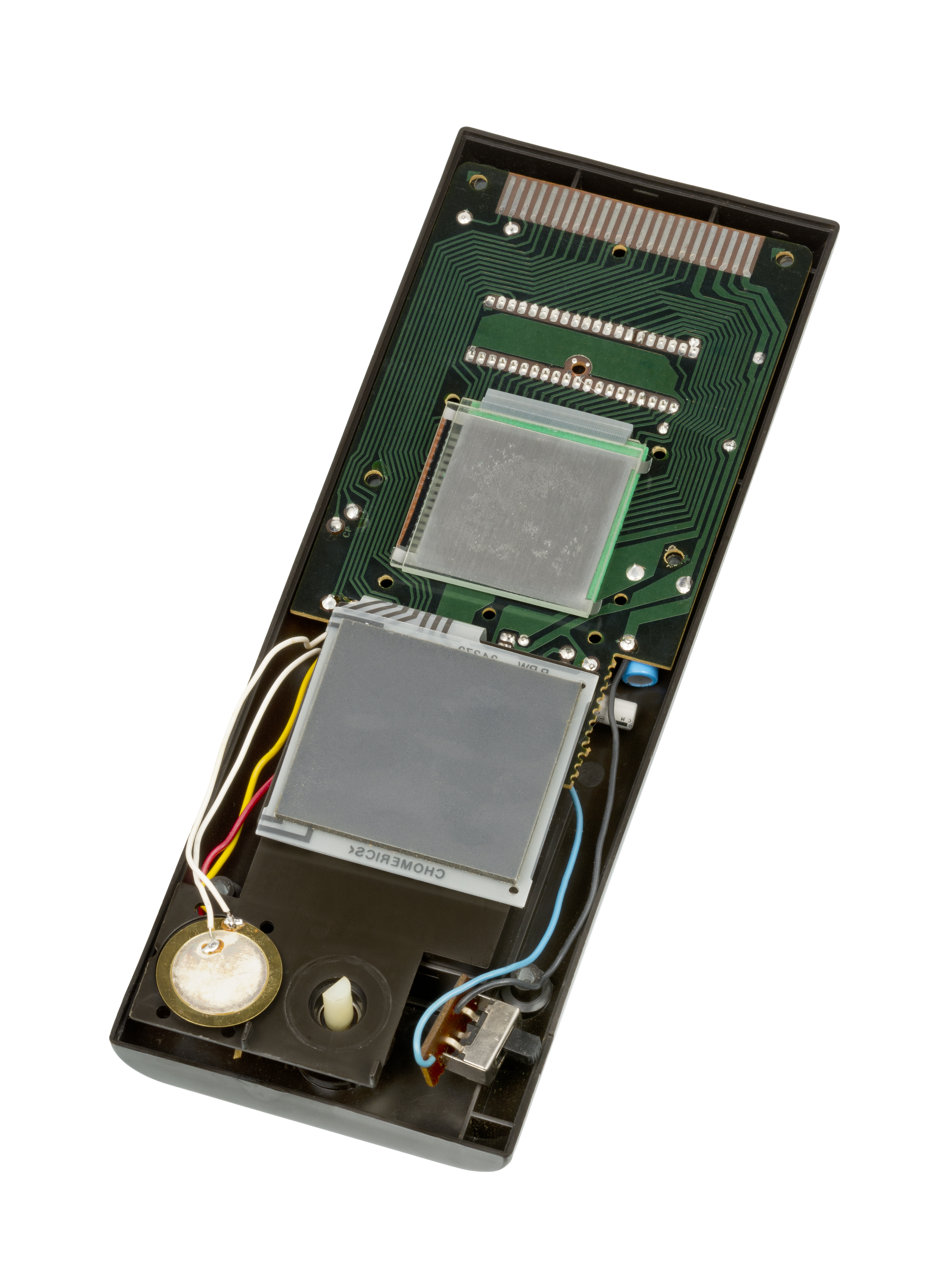
The uncovered LCD screen of a Microvision, showing screen damage

Microvision units and cartridges are now somewhat rare. Those that are still in existence are susceptible to three main problems: "screen rot", ESD damage, and keypad destruction.

=== Screen rot ===
The manufacturing process used to create the Microvision's LCD was primitive by modern standards. Poor sealing and impurities introduced during manufacture have resulted in the condition known as screen rot. The liquid crystal spontaneously leaks and permanently darkens, resulting in a game unit that still plays but is unable to properly draw the screen. While extreme heat, which can instantly destroy the screen, can be avoided, there is nothing that can be done to prevent screen rot in most Microvision systems.

=== ESD damage ===
A major design problem on early units involves the fact that the microprocessor (which is inside the top of each cartridge) lacks ESD protection and is directly connected to the copper pins which normally connect the cartridge to the Microvision unit. If the user opens the protective sliding door that covers the pins, the processor can be exposed to any electric charge the user has built up. If the user has built up a substantial charge, the discharge can jump around the door's edge or pass through the door itself (dielectric breakdown). The low-voltage integrated circuit inside the cartridge is extremely ESD sensitive, and can be destroyed by an event of only a few dozen volts which cannot even be felt by the person, delivering a fatal shock to the game unit. This phenomenon was described in detail by John Elder Robison (a former Milton Bradley engineer) in his book Look Me in the Eye; according to Robison, up to 60% of units were returned as defective during the 1979 holiday season, causing significant panic among Milton Bradley staff and prompting extensive modifications to both later Microvision units (which were his own design) and Microvision factories to better dispel stray static charges.

=== Keypad destruction ===
The Microvision unit had a twelve-button keypad, with the switches buried under a thick layer of flexible plastic. To align the user's fingers with the hidden buttons, the cartridges had cutouts in their bottom (over the keypad). As different games required different button functions, the cutouts were covered with a thin printed piece of plastic, which identified the buttons' functions in that game. The problem with this design is that pressing on the buttons stretched the printed plastic, resulting in the thin material stretching and eventually tearing. Having long fingernails exacerbated the condition. Many of the initial games were programmed to give feedback of the keypress when the key was released instead of when the key was pressed. As a result, users may press on the keypad harder because they are not being provided with any feedback that the key has been pressed. This resulted from a keypad used for prototyping being different from the production keypad; the prototyping keypad had tactile feedback upon key pressing that the production units lacked.

== Technical specifications ==
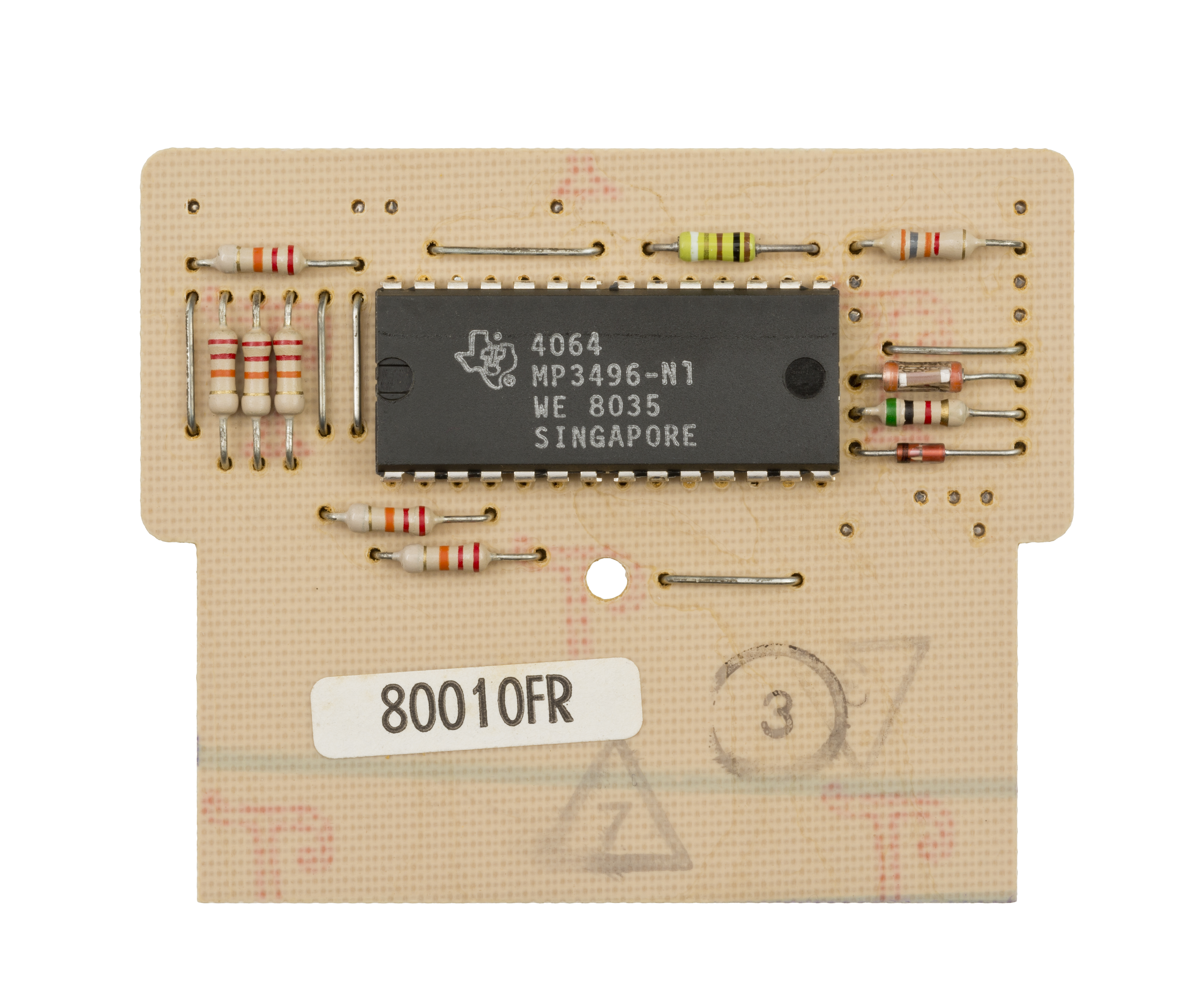
The PCB of a Sea Duel game cartridge, showing the TI3496 processor from the TMS1100 family

- CPU: Intel 8021/TI TMS1100 (on cartridge)
- Screen type and resolution: 16 × 16 pixel LCD
- Register width: 4 bit (TMS1100), 8 bit (8021)
- Processor speed: 100 kHz
- RAM (integrated into CPU): 64 bytes
- ROM: 2K (TMS1100), 1K (8021)
- Cartridge ROM: 2K (TMS 1100), 1K (8021) masked (integrated into CPU; each game's CPU was different)
- Video Display Processor: LCD Custom Driver (made by Hughes)
- Sound: Piezo beeper
- Input: Twelve button keypad, one paddle
- Power requirements: One or two 9 volt batteries on earlier Microvision consoles, one 9 volt battery on later Microvision consoles
- Power Dissipation: 110 mW (TMS 1100), 1 W (8021)

== Games ==
While the game cartridge plastic cases were beige colored in the USA, in Europe they came in a variety of different colors, and the games were numbered on the Box. The age range in Europe for the console and its games was from 8 to 80 years old or 8 to Adult.

There were 12 titles known to have been released.

Background shading and an asterisk indicates cancelled games.

#	US title	Overseas titles	Game number (EU)	Release date	Microprocessor/s	PCB Revision(s)
1	(United States) Block Buster 4952	(United Kingdom) Block Buster (Germany) Block Buster (Netherlands) Block Buster (Italy) Block Buster (France) Casse Brique	(United Kingdom) 1 (Germany) 1 (Netherlands) 1 (Italy) 1 (France) 1	November 1979	TI MP3450A	4952 REV A 4952-56 REV A 4952-79 REV B
2	(United States) Bowling 4972	(United Kingdom) Bowling (Germany) Bowling (Netherlands) Bowling (Italy) Bowling (France) Bowling	(United Kingdom) 2 (Germany) 2 (Netherlands) 2 (Italy) 2 (France) 2	November 1979	TI MP3475NLL	4952 REV A
3	(United States) Connect Four 4971	(United Kingdom) Connect 4 (Germany) 4 Gewinnt (Netherlands) Vier Op'n Rij (Italy) Forza 4 (France) Puissance 4	(United Kingdom) 5 (Germany) 5 (Netherlands) 5 (Italy) 5 (France) 5	November 1979	Signetics Intel 8021 TI MP3481NLL	4971 REV C 4952 REV -
4	(United States) Pinball 4974	(United Kingdom) Pinball (Germany) Pinball (Netherlands) Flipper (Italy) Flipper (France) Flipper	(United Kingdom) 4 (Germany) 4 (Netherlands) 4 (Italy) 4 (France) 4	November 1979	TI MP3455NLL	4952 REV A
5	(United States) Mindbuster 4976	N/A	N/A	1979	TI MP3457NLL	4952 REV A
6	(United States) Star Trek: Phaser Strike (later just Phaser Strike) 4973	(United Kingdom) Shooting Star (Germany) Shooting Star (Netherlands) Shooting Star (Italy) Shooting Star (France) Shooting Star	(United Kingdom) 3 (Germany) 3 (Netherlands) 3 (Italy) 3 (France) 3	1979	TI MP3454NLL	4952 REV A
7	(United States) Vegas Slots 4975	N/A	N/A	1979	TI MP3474-NLL	4952-56 REV -
8	(United States) Baseball 4974	N/A	N/A	1980	TI MP3479-N1NLL	4952-56 REV -
9	(United States) Sea Duel 4064	(United Kingdom) Sea Duel (Germany) See-Duell (Netherlands) Duel (Italy) Duello Sul Mare (France) Bataille Navale (Battleship)	(United Kingdom) 6 (Germany) 6 (Netherlands) 6 (Italy) 6 (France) 6	1980	TI MP3496-N1	4952-56 REV -
10	(United States) Alien Raiders 4176	(United Kingdom) Space Blitz (Germany) Blitz (Netherlands) Blitz (Italy) Blitz (France) Blitz	(United Kingdom) 7 (Germany) 7 (Netherlands) 7 (Italy) 7 (France) 7	1981	TI M34009-N1	4952-79 REV B
11	(United States) Cosmic Hunter 4177	N/A	N/A	1981	TI M34007-N1	4952-79 REV B
12	N/A	(United Kingdom) Super Block Buster (Germany) Super Blockbuster 611497800 (Italy) Super Block Buster (France) Super Casse Brique (Super Brick Breaker) 611497801	(United Kingdom) 8 (Germany) 8 (Italy) 8 (France) 8	1982	TI M34047-N2LL	7924952D02 Rev B
13	Barrage*	?	?	Unreleased (supposed to be released in 1982)	?	

== Reviews ==
- 1980 Games 100 in Games
- 1981 Games 100 in Games

== See also ==
- Mattel Auto Race
- Vectrex
