= List of home video game consoles =

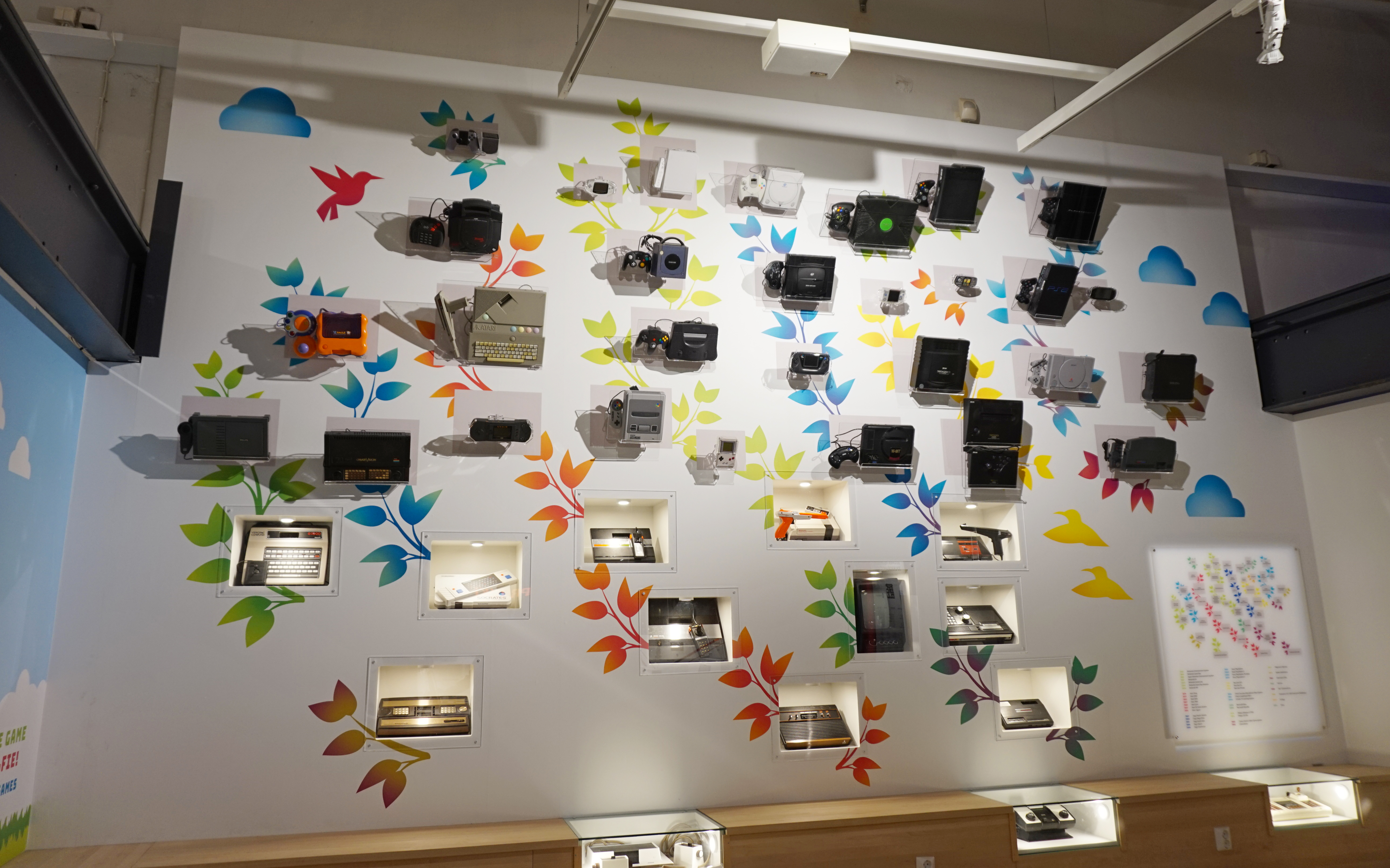
A collection of home video game consoles, arranged in chronological order from bottom to top, at The Finnish Museum of Games, Tampere

A home video game console is a video game console that is designed to be connected to a display device, such as a television, and an external power source as to play video games. While initial consoles were dedicated units with only a few games fixed into the electronic circuits of the system, most consoles since support the use of swappable game media, either through game cartridges, optical discs, or through digital distribution to internal storage. As of 2025, there have been nine console generations, with the current leading manufacturers being Nintendo, Sony, and Microsoft, collectively known as the "big three".

There have been numerous home video game consoles since the first commercial unit, the Magnavox Odyssey in 1972. Historically, these consoles have been grouped into generations lasting each about six years based on common technical specifications.

== Overview ==
A home video game console is a pre-designed piece of electronic hardware that is meant to be placed at a fixed location at one's home, connected to a display like a television screen or computer monitor, and to an external power source, to play video games on using one or more video game controllers. This differs from a handheld game console which will have a built-in screen, controller buttons/features, and a power supply like a battery or battery pack.

Earlier home consoles were typically built from a selection of standard and highly customized integrated computer chips, packaged onto circuit boards and cases. Over time, home console design has converged to a degree with personal computers, using similar component and system design, including standardization with main computer chip architecture. Consoles remain as fixed systems, lacking the customization options that personal computer components have, and most consoles include customized components to maximize space and reduce power consumption to provide the best performance for game playing, while lowering costs with reduced storage and memory configurations.

Home video game consoles typically can play a multitude of games, offered either as game cartridges (or ROM cartridges), on optical media like CD-ROM or DVD, or obtained by digital distribution. Early consoles, also considered dedicated consoles, had games that were fixed in the electronic circuitry of the hardware. Some facets may be controlled by switching external controls on the console but the games could not be changed themselves.

Most home consoles require a separate game controller, and may support multiple controllers for multiplayer games. Some console games can only be played with special, unconventional game controllers, such as light guns for rail shooters and guitar controllers for music games. Some consoles also possess the ability to connect and interface with a particular handheld game system, which certain games can leverage to provide alternate control schemes, second screen gameplay elements, exclusive unlockable content or the ability to transfer certain game data.

== History ==
The first commercial video game console was the Magnavox Odyssey, developed by a team led by Ralph H. Baer and released commercially in 1972. It was shortly followed by the release of the home version of Pong by Atari Inc. in 1975 based on the arcade game. A number of clones of both systems rushed to fill the nascent home console market and the video game industry suffered a small recession in 1977 due to this.

The Fairchild Channel F, released in 1976, was the first console to use game cartridges, which was then used by the Atari VCS and several other consoles of the second generation and led to a second boom in the video game industry in the United States and around the globe. During this time, Atari Inc. had been sold to Warner Communications, and several programmers left the company and founded Activision, becoming the first third-party developer. Activision's success led to a rush of new developers creating games without any publishing controls for these systems. The market became flooded with games, and combined with the rising popularity of the personal computer and the economic recession of the early 1980s, led to the video game crash of 1983 in the U.S. market. Nintendo, which had released its Family Computer console in Japan that year, took several cautionary steps to limit game production to only licensed games, and was able to introduce it, rebranded as the Nintendo Entertainment System (NES) in 1985 into the U.S. market. The NES helped to revive the console market and gave Nintendo dominance during the late 1980s.

Sega took advantage of the newfound U.S. growth to market its Sega Genesis against the Super Nintendo Entertainment System in the early 1990s in the so-called "console wars" and emphasized the notion of "bits" as a major selling point for consumers. The consumer adoption of optical discs with larger storage capacity in the mid-1990s led many console manufactures to move away from cartridges to CD-ROMs and later to DVDs and other formats, with Sony's PlayStation line introducing even more features that gave it an advantage in the market; the PlayStation 2, released in 2000, remains the best-selling console to date with over 155 million units sold. Microsoft, fearing that the PlayStation 2 was threatening the competitive edge of the personal computer, entered the console space with its Xbox line in 2001. Internet connectivity had become commonplace by the mid-2000s, and nearly all home consoles supported digital distribution and online service offerings by the 2010s.

With Sony and Microsoft's dominance in hardware capabilities, most other major manufacturers have since dropped out of the hardware business, but maintain a presence in the game development and licensing space. Nintendo remains the only competitor having taken a blue ocean strategy by offering more original console concepts such as motion sensing in the Wii and the hybrid design of the Nintendo Switch.

Within the home video game console market, the leading consoles have often been grouped into generations, consoles that were major competitors in the marketplace. There have been nine generations of consoles since the 1970s, with a new generation appearing about every five years.

Overview of the console generations, including generation overlaps. Major consoles of each generation are given for each.

== List of home video game consoles ==
There are more than 1000 home video game consoles known to exist, the vast majority of which were released during the first generation: only 98 home video game consoles were released between the second and current generation, and 15 were canceled. (Note: This number is always up to date by this script.) This list is divided into console generations which are named based on the dominant console type of the era, though not all consoles of those eras are of the same type. Some eras are referred to based on how many bits a major console could process. The "128-bit era" (sixth generation) was the final era in which this practice was widespread.

This list only counts the first iteration of each console's hardware, because several systems have had slim, enhanced or other hardware revisions, but they are not individually listed here. The list also includes unreleased systems. If a series of home video game consoles begins in a generation and lasts to another generation, it is listed in the generation the series began. This list does not claim to be complete.

This list does not include other types of video game consoles such as handheld game consoles, which are usually of lower computational power than home consoles due to their smaller size; microconsoles, which are usually low-cost Android-based devices that rely on downloading; retro style consoles; or dedicated consoles past the first generation, which have games built in and do not use any form of physical media. Consoles have been redesigned from time to time to improve their market appeal. Redesigned models are not listed on their own.

The list omits the more than 900 home video game consoles known to have been released in the first generation of video game consoles, those that were generally game consoles for a single dedicated game, such as home Pong consoles. Documented consoles of this generation can be found at list of first generation home video game consoles.

=== Released systems ===
Name	Release date	Manufacturer	Units sold	CPU	"Bits"
Channel F	November 1976	Fairchild (U.S.)	ca. 250,000	Fairchild F8	8-bit (CPU)
RCA Studio II	January 1977	RCA (U.S.)	ca. 60,000	RCA 1802	8-bit (CPU)
Bally Astrocade	April 1978	Midway (U.S.)	?	Zilog Z80	8-bit (CPU)
Atari 2600 / Video Computer System	September 11, 1977	Atari Inc. (U.S.)	ca. 30 million	MOS Technology 6507	8-bit (CPU)
APF-MP1000	January 1, 1978	APF (U.S.)	> 50,000	Motorola 6800	8-bit (CPU)
Champion 2711	1978	Unisonic (U.S.)	?	General Instrument CP1610	16-bit (CPU)
Interton VC 4000	1978	Interton (Germany)	?	Signetics 2650A	8-bit (CPU)
1292 Advanced Programmable Video System	1978	Audiosonic	?	Signetics 2650AI	8-bit (CPU)
Odyssey 2	December 1978	Magnavox (U.S.) / Philips (Netherlands)	2 million	Intel 8048	8-bit (CPU)
APF Imagination Machine	1979	APF (U.S.)	?	Motorola 6800	8-bit (CPU)
Bandai Super Vision 8000	1979	Bandai (Japan)	?	NEC D780C	8-bit (CPU)
Intellivision	1980	Mattel Electronics (U.S.)	ca. 3 million	General Instrument CP1610	16-bit (CPU)
VTech CreatiVision	1981	VTech (Hong Kong)	?	Rockwell 6502	8-bit (CPU)
Cassette Vision	July 30, 1981	Epoch (Japan)	ca. 400,000	NEC uPD77xx	?
Arcadia 2001 and its variants and clones	1982 (Arcadia 2001)	Emerson Radio (U.S.)	?	Signetics 2650	8-bit (CPU)
ColecoVision	August 1982	Coleco (U.S.)	ca. 2 million	Zilog Z80	8-bit (CPU)
Atari 5200	November 1982	Atari Inc. (U.S.)	ca. 1 million	MOS 6502C @ 1.79 MHz	8-bit (CPU)
Vectrex	November 1982	GCE/Milton Bradley Company (U.S.)	?	Motorola MC68A09	8-bit/16-bit (CPU)
Compact Vision TV Boy	October 1983	Gakken (Japan)	?	Motorola MC6801	8-bit (CPU)
Videopac+ G7400 (Note: The Videopac+ G7400 was planned to be released in America as the Odyssey³ Command Center, with a different case design, but it never occurred, although some prototypes exist.)	1983	Philips (Netherlands)	?	Intel 8048 @ 5.91 MHz	8-bit
My Vision	1983	Nichibutsu (Japan)	?	?	?
Pyuuta Jr.	April 1983	Tomy (Japan)	?	TMS9995	16-bit
SG-1000	July 15, 1983	Sega (Japan)	ca. 2 million	Zilog Z80 @ 3.58 MHz	8-bit
NES/Family Computer (Famicom)	July 15, 1983	Nintendo (Japan)	61.91 million	Ricoh 2A03 processor (MOS Technology 6502 core) @1.79 MHz	8-bit
PV-1000	October 1983	Casio (Japan)	?	Z80A clocked at 3.579 MHz	8-bit
Super Cassette Vision	July 17, 1984	Epoch (Japan)	300,000	NEC PD7801G	8-bit (CPU)
Bridge Companion	1985	BBC/Heber (UK)	?	Zilog Z80	8-bit
Video Art	1985	LJN (U.S.)	?	Thompson EF6805 (Motorola 6800-based)	?
Zemmix	1985	Daewoo Electronics (South Korea)	?	Zilog Z80	8-bit
Sega Mark III/Master System	October 20, 1985	Sega (Japan), Tec Toy (Brazil)	ca. 13 million	Zilog Z80 @ 4 MHz	8-bit
Family Computer Disk System (Note: Add-on to Famicom - Japan only.)	February 21, 1986	Nintendo (Japan)	4.44 million	Ricoh 2A03 processor (MOS Technology 6502 core) @1.79 MHz	8-bit
Videosmarts	1986	Connor Electronics (U.S.) (1986–1988), VTech (Hong Kong) (1989–1990)	?	?	?
Atari 7800	May 1986	Atari Corporation (U.S.)	?	Atari SALLY	8-bit
Atari XEGS	1987	Atari Corporation (U.S.)	ca. 2 million	MOS Technology 6502C	8-bit
Video Challenger	1987	Tomy/Bandai (Japan)	?	?	
Action Max	1987	Worlds of Wonder (U.S.)	?	HD401010	8-bit
View-Master Interactive Vision	1988	View-Master Ideal Group, Inc. (U.S.)	?	?	8-bit
Terebikko	1988	Bandai (Japan)	?	?	?
VTech Socrates	1988	VTech (Hong Kong)	?	Zilog Z80A	8-bit (CPU)
Video Driver	October 1988	Sega (Japan)	?		?
GX4000	September 1990	Amstrad (UK)	ca. 14,000	Zilog Z80 @ 4 MHz	8-bit
Commodore 64 Games System	December 1990	Commodore (Canada)	ca. 20,000	MOS Technology 8500 @ 0.985 MHz	8-bit
PC Engine/TurboGrafx-16	October 30, 1987	NEC/Hudson Soft (Japan)	ca. 10 million	Hudson Soft HuC6280	16-bit (8-bit CPU, 16-bit graphics)
Sega Genesis/Mega Drive	October 29, 1988	Sega (Japan)	35.25 million	Motorola 68000 @ 7.6 MHz, Zilog Z80 @ 3.58 MHz	16-bit (16/32 bit processor, 16 bit graphics)
TurboGrafx-CD/CD-ROM²	December 4, 1988	NEC (Japan)	1.92 million	?	16-bit (8-bit processor, 16-bit graphics)
PC Engine2/SuperGrafx	December 8, 1989	NEC (Japan)	ca. 75,000	Hudson Soft HuC6280	16-bit (8-bit CPU, 16-bit graphics)
Neo Geo AES	April 26, 1990	SNK (Japan)	ca. 750,000	Motorola 68000 @ 12 MHz, Zilog Z80A @ 4 MHz	24-bit (16/32 bit processor, 24 bit graphics)
Super NES/Super Famicom	November 21, 1990	Nintendo (Japan)	49.1 million	Ricoh 5A22 @ 3.58 MHz	16-bit
CDTV	March 1991	Commodore (Canada)	ca. 54,800	Motorola 68000 @ 7 MHz	16-bit
CD-i	December 3, 1991	Various	ca. 1.5 million	Philips SCC68070 @ 15.5 MHz	16-bit (could be upgraded to 32-bit)
Sega CD/Mega-CD	December 12, 1991	Sega (Japan)	2.24 million	Motorola 68000 @ 12.5 MHz	16-bit (16/32 bit processor, 16 bit graphics)
Picno	1992	Konami(Japan)	?	?	?
Video Information System	June 1992	Memorex/Tandy Corp (U.S.)	ca. 11,000	Intel 80286 @ 12 MHz	16-bit
FM Towns Marty	February 20, 1993	Fujitsu (Japan)	ca. 45,000	AMD 386SX at 16 MHz	32-bit
Sega Pico	June 26, 1993	Sega/Majesco (Japan)	ca. 3.8 million	Motorola 68000 @ 7.6 MHz, Zilog Z80 @ 3.58 MHz	16-bit
Pioneer LaserActive	August 20, 1993	Pioneer Corporation (Japan)	ca 10,000	?	
Amiga CD32	September 17, 1993	Commodore (Canada)	ca. 100,000	Motorola 68EC020@ 14.18 MHz (PAL) 14.32 MHz (NTSC)	32-bit
3DO	October 4, 1993	Panasonic/Sanyo (Japan) GoldStar (South Korea) The 3DO Company (United States)	ca. 2 million	RISC CPU ARM60 based on ARM architecture @ 12.5 MHz	32-bit
Atari Jaguar	November 23, 1993	Atari Corporation (U.S.)	ca. 250,000	Motorola 68000 @ 13.295 MHz, Custom 32-bit graphics RISC "Tom" @ 26.59 MHz, Custom 32-bit sound RISC "Jerry" @ 26.59 MHz	64-bit (64-bit graphics, 32-bit processor)
CPS Changer	1994	Capcom (Japan)	?	Motorola 68000 @ 10 MHz	16-bit
Neo Geo CD (Note: SNK created the Neo Geo CD as a much cheaper alternative to the AES, lowering the price of games considerably, from ≈300$ to ≈50$ . It's essentially an AES console with a media format change from cartridges to CDs, placing it in the fourth generation.)	September 9, 1994	SNK (Japan)	570,000	Motorola 68000 @ 12 MHz, Zilog Z80 @ 4 MHz	16-bit
Playdia	September 23, 1994	Bandai (Japan)	?	Toshiba TMP87C800F	8-bit
32X	November 21, 1994	Sega (Japan)	ca. 800,000	2 × SH-2 32-bit RISC @ 23 MHz	32-bit
Sega Saturn	November 22, 1994	Sega (Japan)	9.26 million	2× Hitachi SH-2 @ 28.6 MHz	32-bit
PlayStation	December 3, 1994	Sony (Japan)	102.49 million	R3000 @ 33.8688 MHz	32-bit
PC-FX	December 23, 1994	NEC (Japan)	ca. 400,000	NEC V810	32-bit
Pippin	March 28, 1995	Bandai (Japan)/Apple Inc. (U.S.)	ca. 42,000	PowerPC 603 RISC (66 MHz)	32-bit
Satellaview	April 23, 1995	Nintendo (Japan)	At least 100,000	?	16-bit
Atari Jaguar CD	September 21, 1995	Atari Corporation (U.S.)	?	?	64-bit (uses Jaguar processors)
Casio Loopy	October 19, 1995	Casio (Japan)	?	RISC SH-1 (SH7021)	32-bit
Super A'Can	October 25, 1995	Funtech (Taiwan)	?	Motorola 68000 @ 10.738635 MHz	
Nintendo 64	June 23, 1996	Nintendo (Japan)	32.93 million	NEC VR4300 @ 93.75 MHz	64-bit
Dreamcast	November 27, 1998	Sega (Japan)	9.13 million	Hitachi SH-4 32-bit RISC @ 200 MHz	128-bit (32-bit processor, 128-bit graphics)
Nintendo 64DD	December 1, 1999	Nintendo (Japan)	ca. 15,000	?	32-bit co-processor (uses 64-bit N64 processor as main processor)
Nuon	2000	VM Labs (U.S.) Motorola/RCA (United States) Samsung (South Korea) Toshiba (Japan)	ca. 25,000	Nuon MPE hybrid stack processor	128-bit (SIMD)
PlayStation 2	March 4, 2000	Sony (Japan)	155 million	Emotion Engine @ 294.912 MHz (launch), 299 MHz (newer models)	128-bit (SIMD)
GameCube	September 14, 2001	Nintendo (Japan)	21.74 million	IBM PowerPC Gekko @ 486 MHz	32-bit (CPU) 128-bit (SIMD)
Xbox	November 15, 2001	Microsoft (U.S.)	ca. 24 million	Custom 733 MHz Intel Pentium III "Coppermine-based" processor	32-bit (CPU) 128-bit (SIMD)
Xavix PORT	2004	SSD COMPANY LIMITED (Japan)	?	?	8-bit,16-bit and 32-bit (depending on game cartridge)
V.Smile	August 4, 2004	VTech (Hong Kong)	?	Sunplus SPG2xx	16-bit
Advanced Pico Beena	2005	Sega (Japan)	ca. 4.1 million	ARM7TDMI clocked at 81 MHz	32-bit (CPU)
V.Smile Baby Infant Development System	2006	VTech (Hong Kong)	?	?	128-bit
Game Wave Family Entertainment System	October 2005	ZAPiT (Canada)	ca. 70,000	Mediamatics 8611	
Xbox 360	November 22, 2005	Microsoft (U.S.)	ca. 85.8 million	Big-endian architecture 3.2 GHz PowerPC Tri-Core Xenon	64-bit CPU 128-bit extensions
V.Flash	September 2006	VTech (Hong Kong)	?	ARM-9	32-bit
HyperScan	October 23, 2006	Mattel (U.S.)	ca. 10,000	Sunplus SPG290	32-bit
PlayStation 3	November 11, 2006	Sony (Japan)	86.9 million	3.2 GHz Cell Broadband Engine with 1 PPE & 7 SPEs	64-bit CPU with set of 128-bit registers
Wii	November 19, 2006	Nintendo (Japan)	101.63 million(as of December 31, 2016)	PowerPC 750-based IBM PowerPC "Broadway" @ 729 MHz; 2.9 GFLOPS	32-bit (CPU)
Zeebo	May 25, 2009	TecToy (Brazil)	?	ARM11 / QDSP-5 in Qualcomm MSM SoC running at 528 MHz	32-bit (CPU)
Wii U	November 18, 2012	Nintendo (Japan)	13.56 million	PowerPC 750-based 1.24 GHz Tri-Core IBM PowerPC "Espresso"	32-bit (CPU)
PlayStation 4	November 15, 2013	Sony (Japan)	115.9 million	Semi-custom 8-core AMD x86-64 Jaguar 1.6 GHz CPU (integrated into APU)	64-bit (CPU)
Xbox One	November 22, 2013	Microsoft (U.S.)	ca. 41 million (Note: Starting with Microsoft's fiscal quarter ending June 2014 (Q4), the company stopped divulging individual platform sales in their fiscal reports and subsequent Xbox sales are based on industry estimates.)	Custom 1.75 GHz AMD 8-core APU (2 quad-core Jaguar modules)	64-bit (CPU)
Nintendo Switch (Note: The Nintendo Switch was released during this period, but has been referred to as a hybrid video game console, combining features of home and handheld systems. This is why the Switch appears in both the list of home video game consoles and the list of handheld game consoles.)	March 3, 2017	Nintendo (Japan)	154 million	Octa-core (4×ARM Cortex-A57 & 4×ARM Cortex-A53) @ 1.020 GHz	64-bit (CPU)
Xbox Series X/S	November 10, 2020	Microsoft (U.S.)	ca. 21 million	Custom 8-core AMD Zen 2; Series X: 3.8 GHz, 3.6 GHz with SMT; Series S: 3.6 GHz, 3.4 GHz with SMT	64-bit (CPU)
PlayStation 5	November 12, 2020	Sony (Japan)	65.6 million	Custom 8-core AMD Zen 2, variable frequency, up to 3.5 GHz	64-bit (CPU)
Evercade VS	December 2021	Blaze Entertainment (UK)	?	Unknown ARM Cortex-A7 4-core at 1.5 GHz	32-bit (CPU)
Nex Playground	December 2023	Nex Team Inc. (U.S.)	>1 million	Amlogic A311D2-NOD	64-bit (CPU)
Nintendo Switch 2	June 5, 2025	Nintendo (Japan)	19.86 million	ARM Cortex-A78C with 8 cores, peak of 1.7GHz	64-bit (CPU)

=== Unreleased systems ===
Name	Release date	Manufacturer	CPU	"Bits"
Amico	TBA	Intellivision Entertainment	Octa-core Snapdragon 624 @ 1.8 GHz	x86 (64/32-bit)

=== Canceled systems ===
Name	Release date	Manufacturer	CPU	"Bits"
Game Brain	cancelled (supposed to be released in June 1978)	Atari (U.S.)	?	?
Atari 2700	cancelled (supposed to be released in 1981)	Atari, Inc. (U.S.)	MOS Technology 6507	8-bit (CPU)
Video Arcade System	cancelled (supposed to be released in 1983)	Ultravision (U.S.)	?	?
RDI Halcyon (Note: Although fully developed, functional, and with 2 games ready, the few Halcyon units that exist were handmade for investors of the company to try out the product, it is not believed that it ever went into full production or entered the market at all. Less than 12 main control units (Halcyon 200LD, the console itself) are known to exist, but more Halcyon branded Laserdisc players (LD-700, made by Pioneer) exist.)	cancelled (supposed to be released in January 1985)	RDI Video Systems (U.S.)	Zilog Z80	8-bit (CPU)
Control-Vision	cancelled (supposed to be released in 1989)	Digital Pictures & Hasbro (U.S.)	?	?
Krokha (Note: The Krokha (Russian: Кроха, lit. 'Baby') was a Soviet console that was ready to launch in 1990, but production halted, only one game was made, and the approximately 200 consoles were given out to employees of the factory that manufactured it.)	cancelled	SKB Kontor(Russia)	K580VM80A 2 MHz	?
Konix Multisystem	cancelled (supposed to be released in August 1989)	Konix (UK)	Intel 8086 based processor	16-bit (CPU)
Panther	cancelled (supposed to be released in 1991)	Atari Corporation (U.S.)	Motorola 68000	32-bit
WOWOW	cancelled (supposed to be released in 1992)	Taito (Japan)	Motorola 68000	16-bit / 32-bit (CPU)
SNES-CD	cancelled (development stopped in 1993)	Nintendo (Japan)	?	16-bit (Sony version); 32-bit (NEC V810, Philips version)
Neptune	cancelled (supposed to be released in Fall 1995)	Sega (Japan)	?	32-bit
Indrema Entertainment System/L600	cancelled (development stopped in April 2001)	Indrema (U.S.)	x86 @ 600 MHz (later a 750 MHz AMD Duron-based processor)	32-bit
M2	cancelled (supposed to be released in 1997)	Panasonic (Japan)	Dual PowerPC 602 Processors @ 66 MHz	64-bit (dual 32-bit)
Phantom	cancelled (supposed to be released in September 2005)	Phantom (U.S.)	?	?
Chameleon	cancelled (supposed to be released in 2016)	Coleco Holdings Retro	?	?

== See also ==
- List of best-selling game consoles
- List of game controllers
- List of video game console emulators
- Lists of video game consoles
  - List of dedicated video game consoles
  - List of handheld game consoles
  - List of microconsoles
  - List of retro style video game consoles
  - Lists of video games
