= APF TV Fun series =

Series of home video game consoles

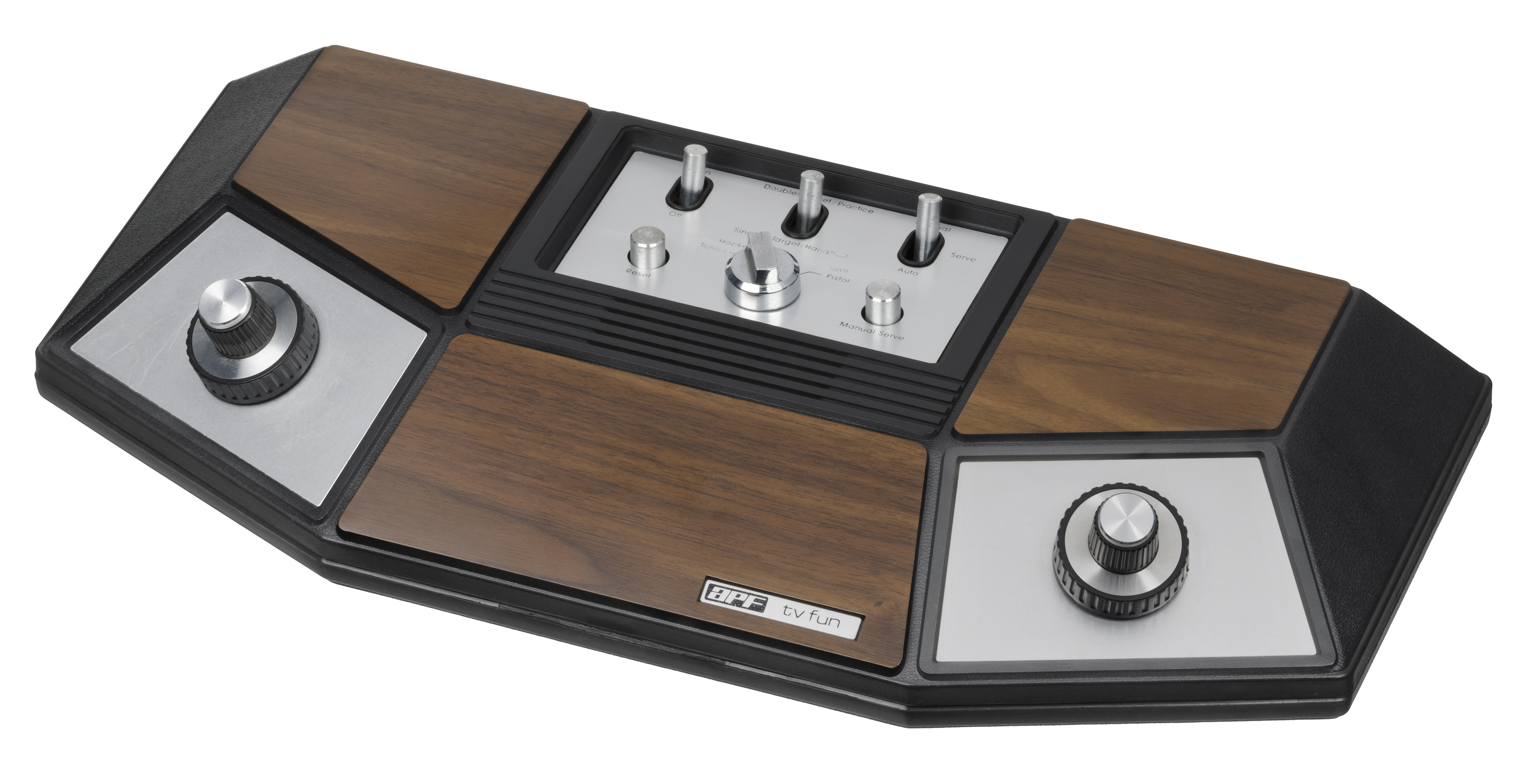
- An APF TV Fun (model 402C)
- Developer: APF Electronics Inc.
- Manufacturer: APF Electronics Inc.
- Type: Series of dedicated home video game consoles
- Generation: First generation
- Released: 1976; 50 years ago
- CPU: AY-3-8500 chipset from General Instruments
- Display: Vertical orientation, black-and-white raster display, standard resolution
- Sound: Amplified mono (one channel)
- Successor: APF-MP1000

The APF TV Fun brand (stylized as aPF tv fun on its logo) is a series of dedicated home video game consoles manufactured by APF Electronics Inc. and built in Japan starting in 1976. The systems were among the first built on the General Instrument "Pong-on-a-chip", the AY-3-8500, that allowed many manufacturers to compete against the Atari Home Pong. The APF TV Fun consoles were one of the earliest Pong clone consoles. APF first gained FCC approval on the device in June 1976. First shipments began sometime afterwords.

The TV Fun package is the first excursion of APF into the video game market; APF was formerly a calculator and other small electronics developer. It was sold at Sears under the name Hockey Jockari. TV Fun was followed up by the 8-bit APF-MP1000 in 1978 and then APF Imagination Machine in 1979. These were made to compete in the 2nd generation of early ROM cartridge consoles, namely the Atari VCS.

== Models ==
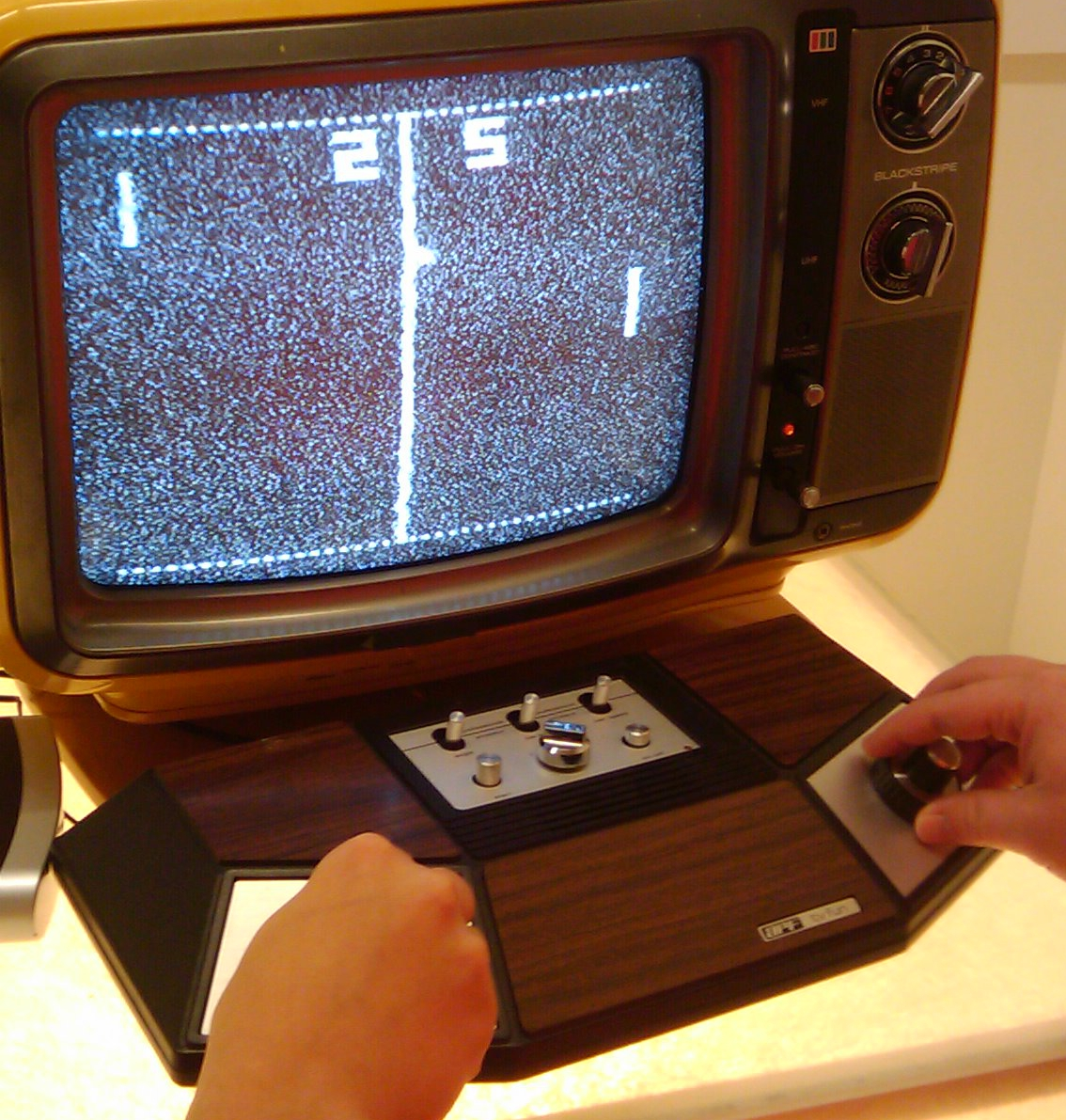
APF TV Fun being played

Most or all TV Fun consoles were manufactured in Japan. APF also sold a 'Match' system, which was in a different, more boxy woodgrain cabinet. This had two detachable wired controllers, based on the same General Instruments chip.

- The Model 401 (released in 1976) and 401a features four built-in games, a built-in speaker, and two controller knobs, Toggle Switches (choices are "Professional" and "Amateur") for the following settings - Angle / Bat Size / Ball Speed. There are 2 buttons - Power and Start Game, and a dial to select between the four built-in games.
- The Model 402 ("Sportsarama") features five built-in games (Handball, Tennis, Hockey, Target Shoot, and Skeet Shoot). Of these, Handball and Tennis could be played in singles or doubles mode, and Hockey could be played in 2- or 4-player mode. Along with the two on-console analog controller knobs introduced with the 401, the 402 also includes two wired controllers and a black plastic light gun. The 402 has different options than the 401, lacking the angle/bat size/ball speed, but adding in options for 4-player games, a manual or auto serve, a serve button, and light gun functionality. Digital scoring up to 21 points appears on screen, and the system offers color visuals. As with the 401, the 402 model is built in a faux woodgrain cabinet, and can be powered by an AC adapter or by using six C size batteries.
- The Model 405 (released in February 1977) features three two-person games (Tennis/Table Tennis, Hockey/Football, and Squash), and a solo-play version of Handball. The 405 includes two wireless controllers and offers players three different skill settings (amateur, average, and professional) and a choice between an automatic or manual serve. Digital scoring up to 15 points appears on screen. As with prior models, the 405 can be powered by an AC adapter or by using six C size batteries.
- The Model 406 is the color television version of the 405. It features the same three two-person games (Tennis, Hockey, and Squash), and the solo-play Handball. The 406 has the same options and settings as the 405, and the same point total (15 points). The 406 can be powered by an AC adapter or by using six C size batteries.
- The Model 442 features five games: Tennis/Ping Pong, Hockey, Football, Singles Handball, and Squash. The 442 provides an automatic serve function and offers two different skill settings (amateur and professional) that adjust paddle size, ball speed, and angle of deflection. Digital scoring up to 15 points appears on screen. The 442 can be powered by an AC adapter or by using six C size batteries.
- The Model 444 features four games (Tennis, Hockey, Singles Handball, and Squash) with up to eight setting variations possible. The 444 provides an automatic serve function and offers both amateur and professional skill settings that adjust paddle size, ball speed, and angle of deflection. Digital scoring up to 15 points appears on screen. The 444 can be powered by an AC adapter or by using six C size batteries.
- The Model 500 (unreleased) features twenty different two-player space battle games including Space War, Space Phasor, Phantom War, and Phantom Phasor among others. The 500 includes two wireless controllers used to guide spaceships and launch missiles. On-console controls allow players to adjust asteroid speed and phantom rocket density to match player' skill levels. Digital scoring up to 20 points appears on screen, with a blinking "W" symbol indicating when the players have won the game. The system offers color visuals, and is powered by six C size batteries or an AC adapter.

=== Comparison ===
Model	Pong games	Rifle games	Chip	Players	Year	Note
Model 401	Handball, squash, tennis, hockey	-	AY-3-8500	2	1976	-
Model 401A	Handball, squash, tennis, hockey	-	AY-3-8500	2	1976	-
Model 401T	Baseball, squash, tennis, soccer	-	AY-3-8500	2	?	-
Model 402	Handball, tennis, hockey	Target Shoot, skeet	MPS7600	4	1976	-
Model 402E	Handball, tennis, hockey	Target Shoot, skeet	MPS7600	4	1976	-
Model 402 Sportsarama	Handball, tennis, hockey	Target Shoot, skeet	MPS7600	4	1976	-
Model 405 (APF Match)	Handball, tennis, squash, hockey	-	AY-3-8500	2	1977	Rectangular console. The paddles are set in the body of the console but are also removable. Also sold as Match SD-01c, white with a wood-like panel and as Sears Tele-Games Hockey-Tennis III.
Model 406 (APF Match)	Handball, tennis, squash, hockey	-	AY-3-8500	2	1977	Rectangular console. The paddles are set in the body of the console but are also removable. Also sold as Match SD-01c, white with a wood-like panel and as Sears Tele-Games Hockey-Tennis III.
Model 442	?	-	TMS-1955	2	?	Two independent paddle separated from the body of the console.
Model 444	?	-	?	4	?	-
Model 500	?	-	?	?	unreleased	-
