= Next Generation (magazine) =

Defunct video game magazine

- January 1995 cover
- Frequency: Monthly
- First issue: January 1995
- Final issue Number: January 2002; 85
- Company: Imagine Media
- Country: United States
- Based in: Brisbane, California
- ISSN: 1078-9693

Next Generation was an American video game magazine that was published by Imagine Media (now Future US). It was affiliated to and shared content with the UK's Edge magazine. Next Generation ran from January 1995 until January 2002. It was published by Jonathan Simpson-Bint and edited by Neil West. Other editors included Chris Charla, Tom Russo, and Blake Fischer.

Next Generation initially covered the 32-bit consoles including 3DO, Atari Jaguar, and the then-still unreleased Sony PlayStation and Sega Saturn. Unlike competitors GamePro and Electronic Gaming Monthly, the magazine was directed towards a different readership by focusing on the industry itself rather than individual games.

== Publication history ==
The magazine was first published by GP Publications up until May 1995 when the publisher rebranded as Imagine Media.

In September 1999, Next Generation was redesigned, and its cover name shortened NextGen. A year later, in September 2000, the magazine's width was increased from its standard 8 inches to 9 inches. This wider format lasted less than a year.

The brand was resurrected in 2005 by Future Publishing USA as an industry-led website, Next-Gen.biz. It carried much the same articles and editorial as the print magazine, and reprinted many articles from Edge, the UK-based sister magazine to Next-Gen. In July 2008, Next-Gen.biz was rebranded as Edge-Online.com. Previous subscribers of NextGen Magazine started receiving copies of PlayStation magazine at the end of its life-cycle.

== Content ==
Next Generation's content did not focus on screenshots, walkthroughs, and cheat codes. Instead the content was more focused on game development from an artistic perspective. Interviews with people in the video game industry often featured questions about gaming in general rather than about the details of the latest game or game system they were working on.

Next Generation was first published prior to the North American launch of the Sega Saturn and Sony PlayStation, and much of the early content was in anticipation of those consoles.

Apart from the regular columns, the magazine did not use bylines. The editors explained that they felt the magazine's entire staff should share the credit or responsibility for each article and review, even those written by individuals.

The review ranking system was based on a number of stars (1 through 5) that ranked games based on their merits overall compared to what games were already out there.

Next Generation had a few editorial sections like "The Way Games Ought To Be" (originally written every month by game designer Chris Crawford) that would attempt to provide constructive criticism on standard practices in the video game industry.

The magazine's construction and design was decidedly simple and clean, its back cover having no advertising on it initially, a departure from most other gaming magazines. The first several years of Next Generation had a heavy matte laminated finish cover stock, unlike the glossy paper covers of its competitors. The magazine moved away from this cover style in early 1999, only for it to return again in late 2000.

== Issue history ==
Lifecycle 1

Issue	Feature
v1 #1 (January 1995)	New game consoles
v1 #2 (February 1995)	Online gaming
v1 #3 (March 1995)	PlayStation
v1 #4 (April 1995)	Atari Jaguar
v1 #5 (May 1995)	Ultra 64
v1 #6 (June 1995)	Crossfire
v1 #7 (July 1995)	Wipeout
v1 #8 (August 1995)	Sega Saturn TV Commercials
v1 #9 (September 1995)	Destruction Derby
v1 #10 (October 1995)	Madden NFL '96
v1 #11 (November 1995)	Virtua Fighter's Sarah Bryant
v1 #12 (December 1995)	32-bit Videogame Report
v2 #13 (January 1996)	Ridge Racer Revolution
v2 #14 (February 1996)	Ultra 64
v2 #15 (March 1996)	Next Generation 1996 Lexicon
v2 #16 (April 1996)	How to get a job in the video game industry
v2 #17 (May 1996)	Codename: Tenka
v2 #18 (June 1996)	Microsoft future for gaming: DirectX
v2 #19 (July 1996)	Past, present, and future of online gaming
v2 #20 (August 1996)	Super Mario 64
v2 #21 (September 1996)	Next Generation's Top 100 Games of All-time
v2 #22 (October 1996)	Venture capital in game development
v2 #23 (November 1996)	Artificial Life
v2 #24 (December 1996)	PlayStation vs Nintendo 64 vs Sega Saturn
v3 #25 (January 1997)	Net Yaroze
v3 #26 (February 1997)	Videogame Myths
v3 #27 (March 1997)	Top 10 online gaming sites
v3 #28 (April 1997)	Retrogaming
v3 #29 (May 1997)	Something is wrong with the Nintendo 64
v3 #30 (June 1997)	Why does a game cost $50
v3 #31 (July 1997)	What makes a Good Game
v3 #32 (August 1997)	Video game packaging
v3 #33 (September 1997)	Design documents
v3 #34 (October 1997)	The future of game consoles
v3 #35 (November 1997)	25 Breakthrough Games
v3 #36 (December 1997)	Independent game developers
v4 #37 (January 1998)	The most important people in the American video game industry
v4 #38 (February 1998)	hardcore gaming
v4 #39 (March 1998)	How to get a job in the video game industry
v4 #40 (April 1998)	What the Hell Happened?
v4 #41 (May 1998)	The Fall of BMG Interactive
v4 #42 (June 1998)	How games will conquer the world
v4 #43 (July 1998)	The Licensing Game
v4 #44 (August 1998)	The Console Wars of 1999
v4 #45 (September 1998)	Dreamcast: The Full Story
v4 #46 (October 1998)	A Question of Character
v4 #47 (November 1998)	The secret of Namco's success
v4 #48 (December 1998)	Do video games stand a chance in Hollywood
v5 #49 (January 1999)	What did Super Mario 64 do for video games
v5 #50 (February 1999)	Dreamcast Countdown
v5 #51 (March 1999)	Physics Matters
v5 #52 (April 1999)	Learning Curves
v5 #53 (May 1999)	Man versus machine
v5 #54 (June 1999)	Dreamcast versus PlayStation 2
v5 #55 (July 1999)	Building the Future
v5 #56 (August 1999)	Rare's Triple Threat

Lifecycle 2

Issue	Feature
v1 #1 (September 1999)	Dreamcast Arrives
v1 #2 (October 1999)	Hooray for Hollywood
v1 #3 (November 1999)	PlayStation 2 arrives
v1 #4 (December 1999)	The War for the Living Room
v2 #1 (January 2000)	Crunch time
v2 #2 (February 2000)	The Games of 2000 Will Blow Your Mind
v2 #3 (March 2000)	Raising the Bar
v2 #4 (April 2000)	PlayStation 2: Hands-On Report
v2 #5 (May 2000)	Sega's new deal
v2 #6 (June 2000)	Ready for war
v2 #7 (July 2000)	Metal Gear Solid 2: Sons of Liberty
v2 #8 (August 2000)	The Making of the Xbox
v2 #9 (September 2000)	Dreamcast: The First Anniversary
v2 #10 (October 2000)	Broadband Gaming
v2 #11 (November 2000)	GameCube: Can Nintendo Compete
v2 #12 (December 2000)	2001 PlayStation 2 games
v3 #1 (January 2001)	Got Talent: First Party Developers
v3 #2 (February 2001)	Games Grow Up
v3 #3 (March 2001)	Start your own game company
v3 #4 (April 2001)	Field of Indrema
v3 #5 (May 2001)	Old Systems, New Games
v3 #6 (June 2001)	Sega's Next Move
v3 #7 (July 2001)	Eidos on Edge
v3 #8 (August 2001)	GameCube Exposed
v3 #9 (September 2001)	Video Game U
v3 #10 (October 2001)	25 Power Players
v3 #11 (November 2001)	Xbox arrives
v3 #12 (December 2001)	Nintendo's GameCube is here
v4 #1 (January 2002)	Xbox review
