= Gamewave =

Gamewave or Game Wave may refer to:

- An abbreviation for the Game Wave Family Entertainment System video game console and DVD player
- A rarely used alternate term for chiptune and bitpop music
- The Gamewave Group Limited, an online MMORPG game provider in China.
