= Gildred =

Gildred is a surname. Notable people with the surname include:

- John Gildred (born 1970), American businessman
- Theodore E. Gildred (1935–2019), American businessman and diplomat
