= Chameleon (console) =

Cancelled home video game console

Retro Chameleon (Coleco Chameleon)
- CGI mockup of the proposed console
- Type: Home video game console
- Inception: 2016 (planned)
- Manufacturer: Coleco Holdings Retro
- Last production year: March 2016

The Retro Chameleon, originally called the Retro VGS then Coleco Chameleon prior to the loss of the Coleco Holdings (owner of the Coleco brand name) license, is a cancelled home video game console. Its creators have stated that it was inspired by the second to fifth generations (1976–1999) of home video game consoles, and like most consoles of those generations, the Retro VGS had planned to run all of its games on individual cartridges, as opposed to optical discs and digital download. The Retro VGS was not expected to support any manner of online connectivity whatsoever, meaning all hardware and software released would have been the final product, and would not have the ability to update after release. A Kickstarter campaign was initially planned to raise funds for the project, but this was later moved to Indiegogo one week before the start of the campaign when a physical prototype was not produced.

On March 8, 2016, Retro VGS pulled down their online social media presence after Coleco Holdings had withdrawn their support and involvement from the project.

== History ==
=== Retro VGS crowdfunding campaign ===
The team behind the Retro VGS, as it was originally branded in 2015, was the subject of criticism for its reversal on several of its early promises, including its change in crowdfunding venue from Kickstarter to Indiegogo. The entry level price was raised from US$150 as initially suggested to US$350 and up, not inclusive of shipping charges. The FPGA feature to allow playing classic games that were originally promised were revealed as a "stretch goal" pending crowdfunding at the US$3,100,000 level. The Retro VGS team failed to show hardware prototype or design specifications, a requirement for most Kickstarter promotions. The proposed software for the machine was criticized for not being unique enough from digital releases on other platforms to justify a cartridge release at higher prices. The cartridge-only distribution model does not allow for updates (including bug-fixing) or additional content, which led some critics to question the value offered.

The Indiegogo campaign raised $81,158 out of a $1.95 million goal and was discontinued on September 29, 2015. The Retro VGS team stated that they would grant refunds to all of their IndieGoGo backers.

==== Proposed hardware ====
The console's developers planned to use the main console and cartridge shells of the 1993 Atari Jaguar to house completely new hardware to play brand-new games. The use of the Jaguar's molds for the Retro VGS was boasted as a cost saving measure. The console planned to support both USB and 9-pin controllers and would have included one wired USB controller shipped with the console – a modified version of the Controller Pro U, a third party Wii Pro Controller manufactured by InterWorks Unlimited. Depending upon the level of funding achieved, the developers of the system stated they would have offered an FPGA with ARM architecture. According to the crowdfunding page, the console would have output high-quality audio and video simultaneously in digital and analog formats, and would be able to connect to many types of televisions and other devices via HDMI 1.3, composite video/stereo audio RCA, 9-pin Mini-DIN, USB Type A, and USB Type B.

=== Second Chameleon prototype, questioning and end of project ===
A second prototype was shown at the American International Toy Fair in New York in February 2016, now branded as Coleco Chameleon. The display unit at the show elicited further controversy when the unit was alleged to be nothing more than a Super Nintendo Entertainment System model SNS-101 inside an Atari Jaguar case, due to the use of a SNES controller and the amount of electrical tape present in the show prototype. In response, Retro VGS posted a series of new images to Facebook showing a supposed new prototype in a clear case. Eventually members of the AtariAge.com forum discovered that the new prototype was another fake after finding that the motherboard visible in the clear case was actually an HICAP50B CCTV capture card rather than a game console motherboard. Retro VGS quickly removed the top-down image of the prototype from their Facebook page, but not before a comparison of the prototype and the HICAP50B capture card began circulating the internet.

Shortly after the details of the second prototype began circling around the internet, YouTuber Brian Thomas Barnhart posted a video to YouTube detailing his experiences with the Chameleon after Mike Kennedy asked him to film the video for the Kickstarter campaign. In his video, Barnhart alleges that on two occasions Retro VGS was unable to provide a working prototype for filming, and that shortly before the Kickstarter was due to launch Kennedy asked him to record a short video of Kennedy presenting his call to arms, and several voice-overs to overlay on existing footage of the console. Barnhart ultimately refused to do so, citing that the voice-overs could be misused. Instead, Barnhart invited Kennedy to come on his show The Jag Bar and present the console, an offer that Kennedy ultimately turned down. Barnhart then continued by reading through the entire script that was allegedly provided to him by Retro VGS, which he later released online at atari.io.

On March 2, 2016, Coleco Holdings released a statement on its Facebook page regarding the controversy and the apparent non-existence of a prototype. Coleco Holdings demanded that prototype units be inspected by independent engineers, and stated that they would pull their name and support from the project if the allegations turned out to be true.

On March 8, 2016, Kris Naudus reported on Engadget that Coleco Holdings announced they had withdrawn their name and all Coleco branding from the project, stating: "Retro has decided that the work that they have created is not sufficient to demonstrate at this time. Consequently, we can no longer proceed with the project and the Chameleon project will be terminated. This separation is amicable. We wish Retro luck in the future." Naudus further reported Atari's COO stating that Retro VGS never had a contract with Atari that would allow them to release Atari 2600 games, as Naudus had reported on February 18, 2016.

On the same day, the Retro VGS webpage and social media presence were shut down.

== See also ==
- Ouya
- Phantom (console)
- Indrema
- ZX Spectrum Vega+
- Intellivision Amico
