= Jintan, Changzhou =

Jintan 金坛区 Kintan
- District
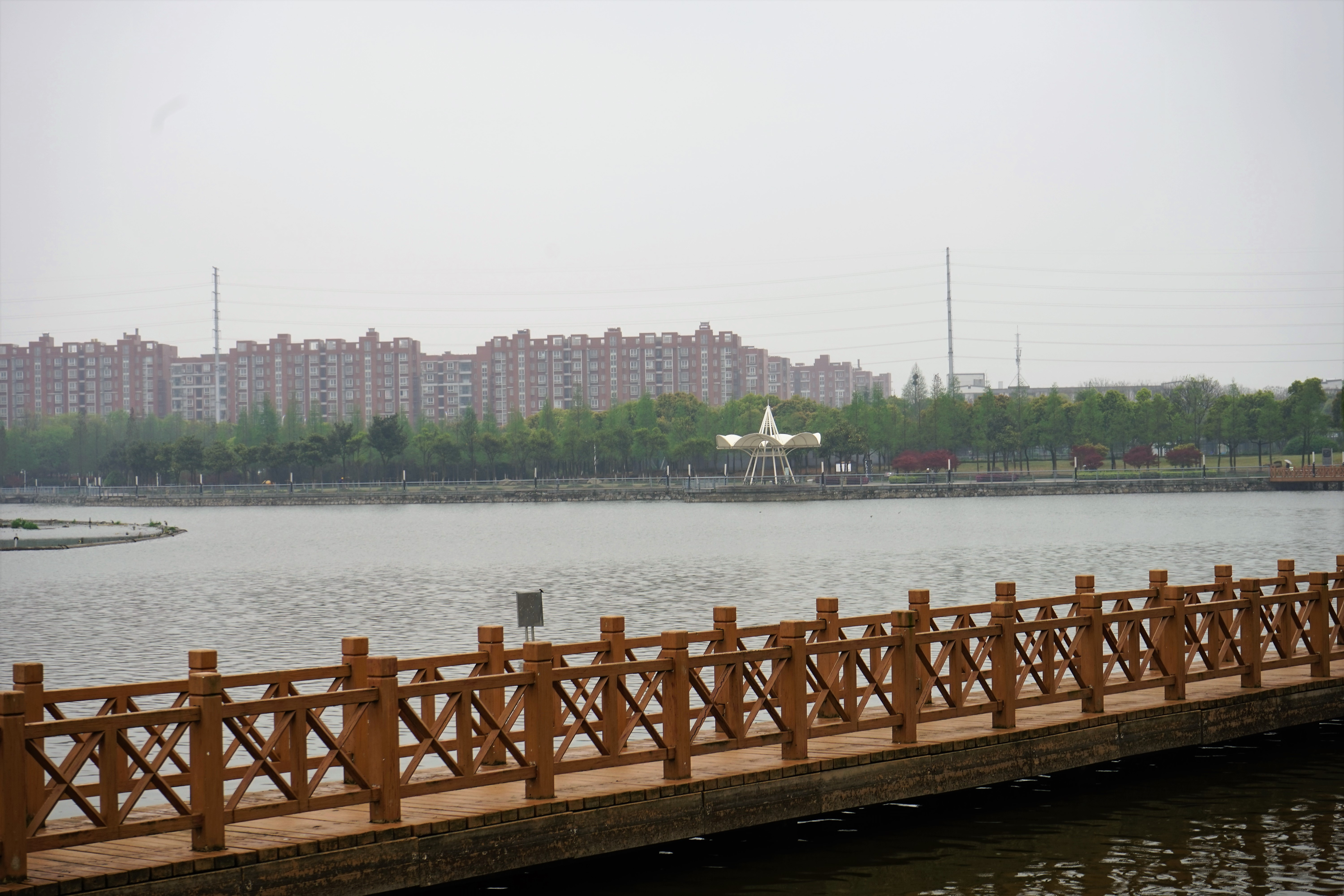

- Location in Jiangsu
- Coordinates: 31°43′19″N 119°31′44″E
- Country: People's Republic of China
- Province: Jiangsu
- Prefecture-level city: Changzhou
- Subdivisions: 3 subdistricts, 6 towns

Area
  - Total: 976.7 km^{2} (377.1 sq mi)

Population (2016)
  - Total: 563,500
  - Density: 576.9/km^{2} (1,494/sq mi)
- Time zone: UTC+8 (China Standard)
- Postal code: 213200

Jintan, Changzhou
- Simplified Chinese: 金坛
- Traditional Chinese: 金壇
- Postal: Kintan
Transcriptions
Standard Mandarin
- Hanyu Pinyin: Jīntán
- Wade–Giles: Chin-t'an
- IPA: [tɕíntʰǎn]

Jintan District is a district under the administration of Changzhou in the Jiangsu province of the People's Republic of China.

== History ==
Jintan, known as Jinshan (金山) in ancient times, was a township of Yanling commandery since the reign of the Emperor Yuan of Jin. Then it was promoted by its inhabitants as Jinshan county to strengthen the local vigilance in the late Sui dynasty, without permission. As a densely populated area, the county was reestablished in about 688 under the Tang dynasty, but since there was a namesake in present-day Jinhua, Zhejiang, it was named after Jintan, a hill of Mao Mountain.

== Location ==
In 1987, the County comprised 22 towns, with the county government located in Jincheng town. On November 10, 1993, Jintan was reclassified from a county and officially became a city. The county was part of Changzhou, Jiangsu province. In 2015, Jintan County has been changed to Jintan District.

Jintan has a total area of 976.7 square kilometers (377.1 square miles). The total land area is 781.27 square kilometers (301.65 square miles), and water covers an area of 194.22 square kilometers (74.99 square miles). As of 2010, it has a permanent resident population of 552,047. Jintan is a 2-3 hour bus ride from Shanghai, and the driving distance from Jintan to Nanjing is one and a half hours.

== Administrative divisions ==
At present, Jintan District has 3 communities and 6 towns.

3 communities

- Dongcheng Community (东城社区)
- Xicheng Community (西城社区)
- Yaotang Community (尧唐社区)

6 towns

- Jincheng (金城镇)
- Rulin (儒林镇)
- Zhixi (直溪镇)
- Zhulin (朱林镇)
- Xuebu (薛埠镇)
- Zhiqian (指前镇)

== Dialect ==
Wu Chinese is the local dialect of Jintan. Some versions include the local dialect and the northern Jiangsu dialect. A fusion of languages has been created due to the geographical location of Jintan. The language habits of migrants have influenced the local language.

== Environment ==
=== Geography and geomorphology ===
Western Jintan includes the mountainous region Maoshan, which covers an area of about 223 square kilometres (86 sq mi). The highest peak of Maoshan is 372.5 metres (1,222 ft) above sea level. Flatlands lie in the east of Jintan, part of the Taihu Plain, with an area of about 752 square kilometres (290 sq mi).

=== Lakes and Rivers ===
Jintan District has 216 rivers with a total length of 512 kilometres (318 mi). The southeast Tiao Lake (also named Changdang Lake), covers 8,200 hectares (32 sq mi). This lake is one of the ten largest freshwater lakes in Jiangsu province.

=== Climate ===
Jintan District comes under the Northern Subtropical Monsoon climate zone. Jintan City's climate is mild and humid with four distinct seasons. The annual average temperature is 16.5 °C (61.7 °F), while average annual precipitation is 1,197.4 millimetres (47.14 in). The frost-free period covers 228 days and the average humidity is 76%.

Climate data for Jintan, elevation 5 m (16 ft), (1991–2020 normals, extremes 1981–present)
Month	Jan	Feb	Mar	Apr	May	Jun	Jul	Aug	Sep	Oct	Nov	Dec	Year
Record high °C (°F)	21.5 (70.7)	26.4 (79.5)	33.2 (91.8)	34.3 (93.7)	37.0 (98.6)	37.5 (99.5)	39.7 (103.5)	40.4 (104.7)	38.0 (100.4)	37.1 (98.8)	29.5 (85.1)	23.3 (73.9)	40.4 (104.7)
Mean daily maximum °C (°F)	7.4 (45.3)	9.9 (49.8)	14.7 (58.5)	20.9 (69.6)	26.2 (79.2)	28.9 (84.0)	32.5 (90.5)	32.0 (89.6)	27.9 (82.2)	22.8 (73.0)	16.6 (61.9)	10.0 (50.0)	20.8 (69.5)
Daily mean °C (°F)	3.4 (38.1)	5.7 (42.3)	10.1 (50.2)	16.0 (60.8)	21.4 (70.5)	24.9 (76.8)	28.6 (83.5)	28.1 (82.6)	23.8 (74.8)	18.2 (64.8)	12.0 (53.6)	5.7 (42.3)	16.5 (61.7)
Mean daily minimum °C (°F)	0.5 (32.9)	2.4 (36.3)	6.4 (43.5)	11.8 (53.2)	17.3 (63.1)	21.7 (71.1)	25.5 (77.9)	25.2 (77.4)	20.6 (69.1)	14.6 (58.3)	8.5 (47.3)	2.4 (36.3)	13.1 (55.5)
Record low °C (°F)	−13.7 (7.3)	−11.6 (11.1)	−8.0 (17.6)	−0.8 (30.6)	5.0 (41.0)	12.9 (55.2)	16.5 (61.7)	17.4 (63.3)	11.4 (52.5)	1.8 (35.2)	−5.4 (22.3)	−11.5 (11.3)	−13.7 (7.3)
Average precipitation mm (inches)	60.5 (2.38)	59.6 (2.35)	85.9 (3.38)	88.5 (3.48)	96.8 (3.81)	222.4 (8.76)	197.9 (7.79)	143.5 (5.65)	88.2 (3.47)	59.1 (2.33)	54.8 (2.16)	40.2 (1.58)	1,197.4 (47.14)
Average precipitation days (≥ 0.1 mm)	10.3	9.9	11.3	10.5	11.2	12.6	12.2	12.0	8.4	7.9	8.5	7.8	122.6
Average snowy days	3.1	2.1	0.8	0.1	0	0	0	0	0	0	0.3	1.0	7.4
Average relative humidity (%)	76	75	74	73	73	78	79	80	78	76	76	74	76
Mean monthly sunshine hours	120.7	122.1	145.8	169.3	177.8	141.0	195.7	195.5	166.9	164.9	142.0	135.0	1,876.7
Percentage possible sunshine	38	39	39	43	42	33	45	48	45	47	45	43	42
Source: China Meteorological Administration

== Economy ==
The total economic output of Jintan
	2003	2004	2005	2006	2007	2008	2009	2010	2011	2012	2013	2014	2015	2016	2017	2018年	2019	2020
GDP/Billion Yuan (Renminbi)	101	122.1	149	182	223	263	261.4	308.3	365.1	373.81	406.12	471.48	525.49	600.02	708.34	801.93	908.6	973.15
Per capita GDP/ Yuan (Renminbi). (Note: Generally calculated based on the resident population)	18650	22594	27567	33854	41023	48257	47858	56000	65946	67129	72755	84495	94090	107242	126376	142819	161514	166300

== Notable people ==
- David Ji (born 1952), Chinese-American electronics entrepreneur who co-founded Apex Digital, and was held against his will in China for months without charges during a business dispute
- Hua Luogeng (1910–1985), mathematician and politician
- Xifeng Wu, Chinese-American cancer epidemiologist
- Duan Yucai (1735–1815), philologist
- Yang Li, activist
