= Pacific States University =

Private university in Los Angeles, California, United States

- Type: Private university
- Established: 1928; 98 years ago
- Chairperson: Jaeun Yoo
- President: Matt Shin
- Location: Los Angeles, California, United States; 34.045°N 118.309°W
- Website: psuca.edu

Pacific States University (PSU) is a private university in Los Angeles, California, United States. Operated by South Korean university Konkuk University, the campus is in the Koreatown neighborhood of Los Angeles. PSU was founded in 1928, and it began offering distance learning in 2003.

PSU is approved by the California Bureau for Private Postsecondary Education and is accredited by Accrediting Commission of Career Schools and Colleges. It was formerly accredited by the Accrediting Council for Independent Colleges and Schools (ACICS). In 2022, the United States Secretary of Education terminated ACICS' accrediting status.

== Notable alumni ==
- David Ji (born 1952), Chinese-American electronics entrepreneur who co-founded Apex Digital, and was held against his will in China for months without charges during a business dispute
