= David Ji =

American businessman

- Born: David Longfen Ji; August 5, 1952 (age 74); Jintan, Jiangsu Province, China
- Education: Fudan University and Pacific States University
- Occupation: Electronics entrepreneur
- Known for: Held against his will in China for months without charges during business dispute
- Title: Chairman and co-founder of Apex Digital
- Awards: Time magazine "Global influential" (2002)

David Longfen Ji (also known as Ji Longfen; born August 5, 1952) is a Chinese-American electronics entrepreneur who co-founded Apex Digital, an electronics trading company based in Los Angeles, California. He was held against his will in China for months without charges during a business dispute.

== Early life ==
Ji is ethnic Chinese, and became an American citizen in 2000. He was born in Jintan, Jiangsu Province in eastern China. He studied at Fudan University in Shanghai, China, graduating from its Department of Foreign Languages, and then emigrated to California in 1987. There he lived in Walnut, California, with his wife Liu Ru Ying and daughter Jean. In the U.S., he earned a Master of Business Administration degree from Pacific States University.

== Business career ==
=== Apex Digital founding and business ===
In the United States, in 1997 Ji co-founded and became chairman of Apex Digital, a Los Angeles electronics trading company. Ji was named by Time magazine one of 15 "global influentials" of 2002. In 2004, Apex had $1 billion in sales.

In 2001, Ji reached an agreement on behalf of Apex with the Chinese company Sichuan Changhong Electric (Changhong). Changhong was China's largest television manufacturer, a supplier majority-owned by the company-town city of Mianyang and the province of Sichuan. The company provided two-thirds of the city of Mianyang's revenue, and Changhong's chairman and managing director Zhao Yong was until late 2004 the city's deputy mayor. Changhong became Apex's largest supplier of DVD players. In 2002, Apex became the top brand of DVD player in the United States. Apex also began selling Changhong-made television sets. Apex sales rose to almost $2 billion in 2003.

=== Arrest by Chinese police, and detention by Changhong ===
On October 23, 2004, as Apex was in a business dispute with Changhong in which the two companies argued over hundreds of millions of dollars, as he was in China on a business trip Ji was arrested by police in his hotel room in Shenzhen, China; the police were Mianyang police who had traveled from 500 miles away from Shenzhen. Changhong accused Ji of defrauding them through bad checks.

He was held in China by Changhong for months without charges. Ji was taken to Sichuan, where he was handed over to Changhong, which kept him in a makeshift jail.

On his fifth day there, he was placed on the phone with a Washington D.C. lawyer named Charlie Wang (Wang Xiaoling, in Chinese), of the American law firm Cadwalader, Wickersham & Taft, who accused Ji of committing fraud and said that Ji's only way out was to sign documents that Wang would deliver to him that would help Changhong recover missing funds.

Ji was then presented with legal documents for his signature that pledged all of Apex's assets as well as Ji's personal assets to Changhong to settle a claimed $470 million debt. Ji initially refused. A guard then asked Ji, "Do you want this pen, or do you want your hand?", as the guard made a motion of chopping off his hand. Ji signed the papers. On December 14, 2004, Changhong sued Apex in Los Angeles County Superior Court, alleging breach of contract and citing the documents Ji had signed. Apex contested the suit, stating that Ji had been abducted and that the documents had been signed under coercion.

In order to create an argument that Ji was not in fact a hostage, Charlie Wang, the Cadwalader lawyer for Changhong, deposed Ji on videotape. Ji did not have a lawyer; Apex later argued that that raised questions as to whether the tape would have any value in American courts. At the deposition, Ji disputed Changhong's version of events; this led to a heated argument between Ji and Charlie Wang, according to people who saw the deposition.

The following day, Ji was taken to meet Mr. Zhao, Changhong's head. Zhao warned Ji that Changhong controlled the Mianyang courts, that Ji would be tried in those courts, and that Changhong would decide if he lived or died.

Charlie Wang then conducted a second taped deposition of Ji. In response to everything Wang asked Ji, Ji muttered agreement, including that Changhong had "invited" him to stay at its apartment in Shanghai.

Apex then complained that Cadwalader lawyer Charlie. Wang had acted improperly and unethically by being a party to Ji' detention. Cadwalader subsequently withdrew from the case. Charlie Wang, who had been made a Cadwalader partner just a few months earlier, left the firm.

On May 28, 2005, seven months after Ji was first detained, he was handed over to the Mianyang police for formal arrest on charges of "financial instrument fraud." In police custody, his conditions improved. In June 2015, Apex acknowledged a $150 million debt, but the debt remained unpaid as Apex said it did not have any money. In August 2015, the police released Ji on restricted bail, without him being indicted.

Ji's case highlighted an "implicit racism" in dealings with American businessmen. As a U.S. citizen he was not granted the same treatment by authorities as non-ethnically Chinese businessmen sharing the same nationality. At the time, Ji was one of a dozen United States businessmen who had been detained in China without due process in the past decade.

For its coverage of the Ji story and half a dozen other related stories, Joseph Kahn and Jim Yardley of The New York Times received a 2006 Pulitzer Prize in International Reporting: "For their ambitious stories on ragged justice in China as the booming nation's legal system evolves."

In 2010, Apex filed for Chapter 11 bankruptcy, which finally closed in January 2018.

=== Later career ===
Ji founded and became chief executive officer of McLovin's Pet (a California pet food and pet care company) in 2020, and chief executive officer and director of Caduceus Software Systems (a holding company which wholly owns McLovin's Pet) in 2023.
