= Xifeng Wu =

Chinese-American cancer epidemiologist

Xifeng Wu (Chinese: 吴息凤; pinyin: Wú Xīfèng) is a Chinese-American cancer epidemiologist known for her cohort studies designed to discover the causes of cancer. She has been Dean of the School of Public Health of Zhejiang University since March 2019. She previously served as Director of the Center for Public Health and Translational Genomics and the Betty B. Marcus Chair in Cancer Prevention at the University of Texas MD Anderson Cancer Center until she was forced to resign in January 2019, as part of the Trump administration's push to counter Chinese influence in American research according to Bloomberg Businessweek.

== Early life and education ==
Wu was born into a family of Chinese medicine practitioners in Jintan, Jiangsu, China. She earned an MD at Shanghai Medical College in 1984, and a master's degree in occupational health from Zhejiang Medical University (now Zhejiang University School of Medicine) in 1987. She subsequently became a researcher at the Zhejiang Academy of Medical Science.

In 1989, she was offered a fellowship by a French professor she had met at a conference and went to France to conduct postdoctoral research at the National Laboratory of Industrial Environment and Risk Analysis. In 1991, she moved to Houston to join her husband, and received a scholarship to study at the University of Texas School of Public Health.

She received her PhD in epidemiology 1994 from the University of Texas Health Science Center. Her dissertation was Genetic susceptibility, cigarette smoking, and wood dust exposure in lung cancer: Case control analyses, and her advisors were Margaret Spitz and George Delclos.

== Career ==
Wu Xifeng helped develop a simple blood test and tools that use a person's health data to predict their risk of cancer and offer advice to lower it. Her work makes it easier for people and doctors to find cancer risk earlier and take action based on each person’s unique genetic and lifestyle profile. She also started patient programs to help improve prevention for many types of cancer.

While still a graduate student, Wu joined the faculty of University of Texas MD Anderson Cancer Center. In 2011, she was named Chair of Epidemiology at MD Anderson. She was later appointed Director of the Center for Public Health and Translational Genomics and Betty B. Marcus Chair in Cancer Prevention. She was named one of Houston's 50 most influential women in 2014.

In January 2019, Wu resigned from her posts at MD Anderson following a three-month investigation by the FBI and the NIH of her ties to China. According to Bloomberg Businessweek, her departure was part of the Trump administration's push to counter China's influence in American research, and ethnic Chinese scientists, including American citizens like Wu, were targeted for investigation. MD Anderson was a center of the crackdown, with three other top Chinese-American researchers being forced out besides Wu. MD Anderson had formerly encouraged international collaboration and created "sister" relationships with five Chinese cancer centers.

In March 2019, Wu was appointed Dean of the School of Public Health of her alma mater Zhejiang University.

== Contributions ==
Wu is known for designing cohort studies for the purpose of discovering the causes of cancer and potential prevention measures. She and her colleagues conducted studies showing that fifteen minutes of moderate exercise per day can increase lifespan by an average of three years, that eating highly cooked meat can contribute to kidney cancer, that high-carbohydrate diets can contribute to lung cancer in non-smokers, and that chronic diseases such as high blood pressure or diabetes can also contribute to cancer. She has also researched and tested machine-learning models as methods of cancer prediction.
