= ApeXtreme =

Cancelled home video game console

- Manufacturer: Apex Digital and Digital Interactive Systems Corp
- Type: Video game console
- Generation: Sixth generation
- Released: Canceled
- Introductory price: $299-$399(Early) $499.95(Later)
- Media: CD-ROM, DVD
- Operating system: Embedded Windows XP
- CPU: VIA C3 @ 1.4 GHz (Early); AMD AthlonXP 2000+ x86 (Later)
- Memory: 256 MB
- Storage: 40GB Hard Disk Drive
- Graphics: DeltaChrome S8 (Early); Nvidia GeForce4 MX (Later)
- Connectivity: Ethernet
- Platform: DISCover
- Marketing target: PC gamers, Console gamers

ApeXtreme is a cancelled video game console that was developed by Apex Digital. While the console made a promising first appearance at the Consumer Electronics Show in January 2004, it had been cancelled by December of that year. The console was initially based on VIA's Glory Personal Gaming Console Platform (although Apex Digital later switched to an AMD CPU and NVIDIA GPU platform), and would have included a keyboard, mouse, game controller, 3.5 inch floppy disk reader, and a remote control.

== History ==
The ApeXtreme was developed by Apex Digital and Digital Interactive Systems Corporation.

The system was announced on January 8, 2004, and the system was shown later that year at E3 2004.

It was reported that the home system was to be released in third quarter of 2004 and planned to be released in two distinct versions: a basic model for US$299, and a more powerful version for US$399. By the time Apex Digital dropped VIA, the price had risen to $499.95.

On December 22, 2004, Apex Digital began pivoting from a release of a gaming console, and on December 31, the console's release was placed on hold.

== Features ==
The system would have sported a number of features related to console gaming and multimedia, such as:

- Drop & Play technology, developed by DISCover, allowing the user to play PC games by simply inserting them into the console's optical drive.
- The ability to store computer games on the system's hard drive.
- The ability to play DVDs, VCDs, audio CDs, MP3s, Windows Media Audio, slideshows and Internet radio.

=== Drop & Play ===
The system's Drop & Play feature works by referring to a database of scripts for information on how each specific game should be played. This technology would allow the console to play normal PC games without modification, at the cost of requiring regular updates to allow the user to play recently released titles.

Furthermore, DISCover would have had to write a script for every one of the titles for which the console boasted support, a list of more than 2700 scripts. Upon the insertion of a valid game disc, the ApeXtreme would have run and maintained the game with only minimal interaction with the user, automatically configuring the game and installing patches where possible. In addition, the system's support for normal USB connections would have allowed the player to select between traditional console and PC input devices (i.e., allowing them to play with either a gamepad or a keyboard and mouse).

Outside of the ApeXtreme, the Drop & Play technology found use in Alienware's DHS series of media centers.

== Specifications ==
=== VIA model ===
At the system's debut at 2004 CES show, the system originally used 1.4 GHz VIA C3 mated to VIA CN400 chipset and DeltaChrome S8 graphics core with 64MB of VRAM as part of VIA's Glory Personal Gaming Console/Eden Embedded System Platform, with six USB ports (four USB 2.0 ports on front, two on rear), and several choices for audio and video connectivity (5.1 channel RCA/optical/coaxial and component/S-Video/composite/DVI, respectively), and a pair of Ethernet and RJ-11 ports for networking, as well as using Windows XP Embedded as the console's operating system. The system sported 256 megabytes of RAM. Internal storage consisted of an either a 20 gigabyte or a 40 gigabyte hard disk drive.

=== AMD model ===
By March 2004, HardOCP reported that Apex Digital had dropped VIA and replaced the CPU with AMD AthlonXP 2000+, mated to NVIDIA's nForce2 IGP and GeForce4 MX graphics card with motherboard manufactured by Biostar. The system had 256 megabytes of RAM.

This version of the system sported a 40 gigabyte storage drive. Networking was supported with an ethernet port. 5.1 Dolby Digital audio was supported.

== See also ==
- Infinium Phantom
- Indrema
