= DISCover =

American gaming technology company

Digital Interactive Systems Corporation
- Trade name: DISCover
- Industry: Video Game Hardware
- Products: ApeXtreme, DHS series PC, Hardcore White-Label Gaming System

Digital Interactive Systems Corporation (or DISCover) was an American company specializing in gaming technology for PCs. They were the creators of the DISCover technology which allow PC games to be played like a video game console. The technology, which features the "Drop and Play" engine, auto-plays CDs or DVDs and automates scripts for installing and updating games. Consoles with the engine connected to the Internet for game updates. This technology debuted at the 2003 Electronic Entertainment Expo. An online service based on GameSpy called "DISCover Arcade" was also announced.

Machines using DISCover technology include the cancelled ApeXtreme, and Alienware's DHS series of media center PCs. Other partners included ABS, TekPanel, and Onkyo.

In August 2007, DISCover announced that their Hardcore White-Label Gaming System, or HAWGS, technology would be used for FiringSquad's Ammo digital distribution service. The following month, in September 2007, the company disclosed the InstaPlay desktop client, which improves the ease of use for accessing games. DISCover chief executive officer David Ferrigno addressed Instaplay concerns and comparisons with other digital distribution services such as Direct2Drive and Steam.

== See also ==
- Alienware
- Media center (disambiguation)
- Tray and Play, a similar technology used in Windows Vista for the PC version of Halo 2
