= Phantom Entertainment =

Company

- Type: Manufacturing
- Industry: Internet TV, media-center and video-game consoles and peripherals
- Headquarters: Ridgewood, NJ
- Key people: John Landino (CEO)
- Products: Phantom Lapboard
- Number of employees: 3 (as of July 2007)

Phantom Entertainment, Inc. (known as Infinium Labs, Inc. until 2006) was a company founded in 2002 by Tim Roberts which made computer keyboards. However, Phantom was best known for the Phantom, a video game console advertised for Internet gaming on demand in 2004; it was never marketed, leading to suggestions that it was vaporware. The company's website was last updated in late 2011, and Phantom's ownership of the domain has since expired.

== History ==
Infinium Labs was founded by Tim Roberts in 2002 as a private company. In January 2003 it issued a press release saying that it would soon release a "revolutionary new gaming platform" with an on-demand video-game service, delivering games through an online subscription. The press release had no specific information, but included a computer-generated prototype design. Due to the use of buzzwords and the lack of details, the product was derided nearly from the beginning by news sites such as IGN and Slashdot and in the Penny Arcade webcomic. The hardware and gaming site HardOCP researched and wrote an extensive article on the company and its operation, and was sued in turn. The Phantom placed first in Wired News's "Vaporware 2004". In 2004, Infinium Labs went public.

Roberts left the company in summer 2005 (with millions of shares of stock) before any products had been delivered. He later rejoined as chairman of the board, but in a July 2007 press release he again resigned from the company. Subsequent CEOs included Kevin Bachus (who took the post in August 2005), Greg Koler (in January 2006) and John Landino, who was appointed CEO and interim chief financial officer in July 2008.

In September 2006 the company (which had changed its name from Infinium Labs) promised to introduce its Phantom Lapboard product in November 2006, with a gaming service to follow in March 2007. In June 2008, the company released the Lapboard. In August 2007, Phantom Entertainment signed an agreement with ProGames Network to provide Lapboards and "game-service content" in hotels worldwide.

== The Phantom ==
The Phantom
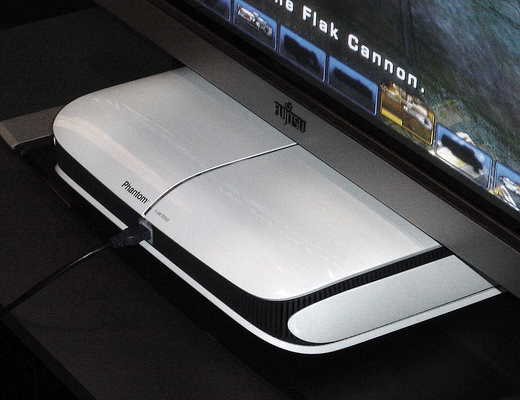
- The Phantom at E3 2004 in Los Angeles
- Type: Home video game console
- Generation: If released, sixth or seventh generation (depending on release date)
- Released: Canceled; release promised in November 2004, January, March and September 2005

The Phantom is a cancelled home video game console whose development was supposedly begun by Phantom Entertainment–then known as Infinium Labs–in 2003. The device was said to be capable of playing current and future PC games, giving the system a large initial game library and making it easier for developers to produce games for the system. The system was said to feature a direct-download content delivery service, instead of the discs and cartridges used by most game consoles at the time.

Press releases said in 2003 that the console would be released that year, and the digital rights management software would be provided by DiStream. A prototype Phantom was first seen at the May 2004 Electronic Entertainment Expo (E3), although it was rumored to be fake. Robrady Design was hired to develop the first Phantom prototype, and Synopse ID was later retained to develop second- and third-generation prototypes.

Two units of the first-generation prototype were known to exist, one publicly destroyed by HardOCP at QuakeCon 2004 as a result of their legal battles with the company (see below), the other was spotted by a computer repair shop in Venice, Florida in 2015 and reported by Ars Technica. In October 2021, a first-generation prototype unit was listed for auction, presumably the same unit that was previously reported by Ars Technica due to its listed repair history. A second-generation prototype unit shown at E3 2004 surfaced a year later after the discovery of the surviving 2003 prototype.

=== Release ===
The Phantom had an online release on August 17, 2003, with basic hardware specifications and a price of "below $399". Options included customized hardware and the PhantomNet (a gaming-content service), priced at $9.95 a month. A sale date for the first quarter of 2004 was set. It was missed; the company later claimed it would go on sale in November for the holiday season, although it had not developed online-delivery software, licensed games or found any retailers. The second deadline was missed, with Infinium sending thousands of faxes claiming that the system would be released in January 2005.

When that deadline passed, Infinium predicted the system's release for around March 2005. That date also passed, and Infinium Labs was absent from the 2005 E3. Kevin Bachus (former Infinium CEO) hinted that the Phantom would be released around the same time as the Xbox 360 in fall 2005, but that date was also missed. By August 2006, the Phantom Console was removed from the products page of the Phantom Entertainment website.

=== Financial problems ===
The company was unable to raise its projected $30 million to complete the Phantom and announced it would downsize and focus on the Phantom Lapboard, a wireless keyboard for home use. On May 16, 2006, the Securities and Exchange Commission accused Phantom Entertainment founder and former CEO Timothy Roberts of running a "pump and dump" scheme in promoting the Phantom console in 2004. The Phantom lost credibility in the gaming and business worlds because its release date was continually pushed back, and because of financial scandals involving Phantom Entertainment (which lost more than $62.7 million since its creation).

== Lapboard ==
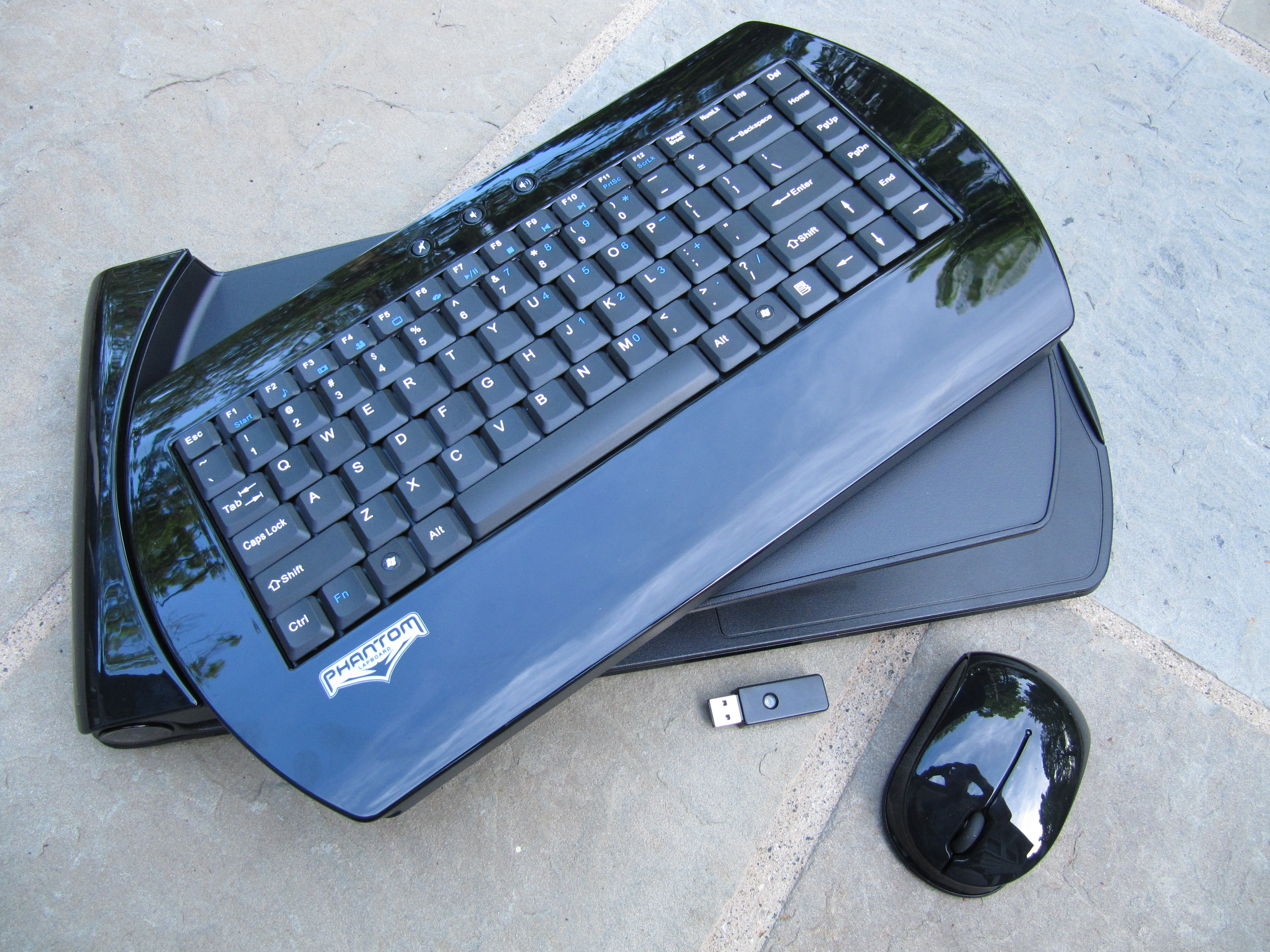
Lapboard (black version)

The Phantom Lapboard is a Wireless keyboard made by the company. It was released on June 23, 2008, two years after its originally planned release date. Designed as a component of the Phantom game console, it was ultimately sold for use with Internet TV and PC video games since the Phantom console was cancelled, and never made it to market. In 2010, a new model of the Lapboard was released to work with Internet TV, gaming and media centers.

=== Announcement ===
On January 3, 2006, Infinium Labs announced that the lapboard component of the console (a keyboard and mouse designed to be held on the lap, for example, seated on a couch in front of a television) was due to be released to online retailers by the second quarter of 2006. On April 19 it announced that the keyboard would not be released in time for Q2 2006, but the device (manufactured by Itron Technology) would be released in North America and Europe "no later than October" 2006. On August 15 it was announced that the price for the Lapboard would be $129.99, with customers who preordered receiving a $30 discount. The keyboard was then delayed until November. On August 22, 2007, Phantom Entertainment signed an agreement with ProGames Network to provide Lapboards and its game services content in hotels worldwide as well as with Alienware for their media center PCs (Alienware later pulled out of the agreement in December 2007 due to another delay in Lapboard's launch). The keyboard was finally released on June 23, 2008, two years after its originally planned release date.

=== Reception ===
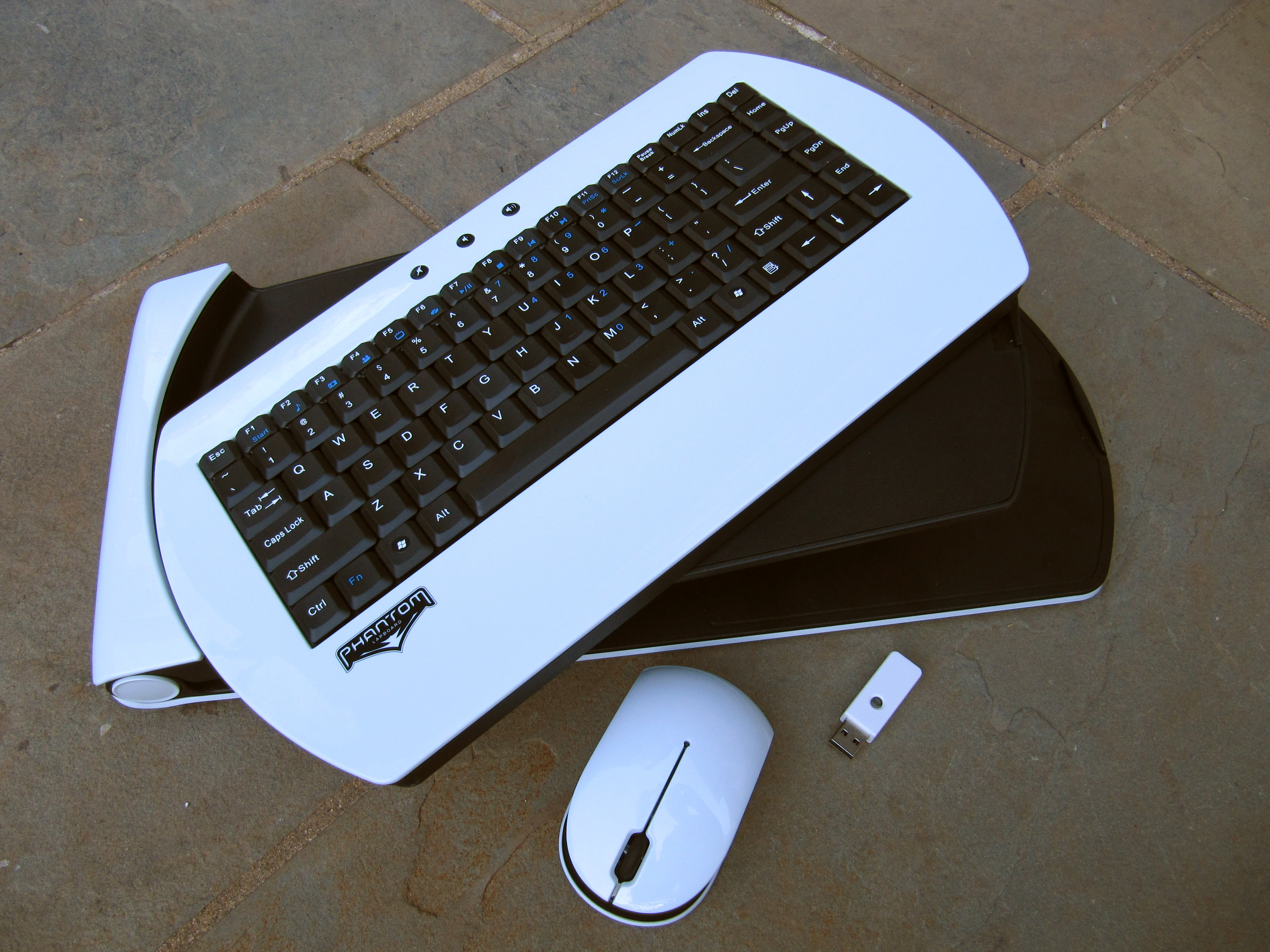
White Lapboard

In April 2008 Maximum PC published a preview of the lapboard, describing it as "extremely promising" although the supplied mouse "experienced signal dropouts at a distance of about 24 inches from the sensor". The author was able to use other wireless mice successfully. The preview states that the peripheral will be available in "June for $130 in limited quantities". In the actual review, however, Maximum PC gave the Lapboard a verdict of 4 out of 10 saying: "The bottom line is that this thing is bad. The mouse isn’t good for gaming, the angled keyboard is awful for typing, and for media playback you’d do much better with a slimmer wireless media keyboard with a built-in trackpad or ball, which are available for significantly less than the Lapboard’s $140 asking price." On July 20, 2009, a sample lapboard received a favorable review from the Hardware Heaven website. Despite its lukewarm review, in May 2010 About.com included the Phantom Lapboard in its Father's Day gift guide. On July 19, 2010, Michael Welter posted a generally positive review of the Phantom Lapboard on Missing Remote.

== Legal controversies ==
=== HardOCP lawsuit ===
In September 2003 HardOCP, a computer-hardware news website, published an investigative report by writer Steve Lynch critical of Infinium Labs and its founder. On February 19, 2004, Infinium Labs' lawyers sent a cease and desist letter to HardOCP's editor demanding that the news site take down the article, claiming that it "painted a portrait of a company intent on swindling the public" and threatening to file a defamation suit. Rather than concede to Infinium's demands, HardOCP owner Kyle Bennett filed a lawsuit for a declaratory judgment that his company had done nothing wrong. Infinium Labs then filed suit in Florida, denying that Texas was the proper jurisdiction (although it had previously maintained a staffed office in Richardson).

In September 2004, the judge required Infinium Labs to produce a number of financial records, including Roberts's personal income-tax returns, by the end of that month. Because the company failed to produce the required documents, HardOCP won a court order compelling them to do so. The judge ruled that sanctions would be awarded to KB Networks and Kyle Bennett in an amount to be determined by the court (later reported as $50,000). Infinium Labs settled the suit, agreeing to drop the pending Florida suit, and admitting all allegations of KB Networks' Texas complaint; they paid $50,000 to end the suit.

=== Other controversies ===
In October 2005, it was reported that the U.S. Securities and Exchange Commission (SEC) had notified Tim Roberts that charges were pending against him for violating federal securities laws. In a statement about the notice, Infinium said it was not notified of specific charges, but suspected they were related to an SEC investigation of the unlawful promotion of penny stocks (including Infinium's). Roberts hired a stock promoter to send faxes claiming that the Phantom console's release was imminent, and the company's stock price might increase as much as 3,000 percent. The SEC alleged that the company never intended to release the console at the promised time due to significant unresolved "technological and manufacturing hurdles", and the faxes were part of a pump and dump scheme on the part of Roberts. Roberts reached a settlement with the SEC in which he was barred from serving as an officer or public director of a public company or participating in penny-stock offerings for five years and paid a $30,000 fine. Roberts was again convicted of fraud in 2017 in a case involving his cloud commerce startup venture Savtira, which collapsed in 2011. He was sentenced to six years and eight months in federal prison, and was ordered to pay $5,874,912.52 in restitution to the victims.

When Roberts was CEO of Infinium, the company failed to report a substantial amount of interest and penalties on unpaid payroll taxes. From its inception, the company had consistently reported a small amount of cash on hand amid extensive (and increasing) debt.

In January 2006, Infinium Labs reached an agreement to borrow up to $5,000,000 from Golden Gate Investors to finance the manufacturing of the Phantom Lapboard, scheduled for release later that year. This would have been the largest amount of money Infinium Labs had ever borrowed at one time. The loan would have been repaid over three years, with an option of repayment with shares of common stock.

In February, GameSpot reported that Phantom Entertainment was suspending the Phantom Game Service to develop the Lapboard. An SEC filing showed three-year losses in excess of $62.7 million, over half of which was marketing for the company and unreleased products. Over $24 million was spent on salaries and consultants, and $2.5 million on development. Infinium claimed it still intended to release the Lapboard if its financial situation improved, but it missed release dates for the second quarter of 2006, October 2006 and November 2006. On August 15, 2006, Phantom Entertainment removed all references to the Phantom Game Receiver from its website, claiming that the content-delivery system targeted for the Phantom would be available for PCs running the Microsoft Windows XP Media Center edition; it later indicated this service would be available in March 2007, after the initially planned November 2006 release of the Lapboard, the service did not materialize when the Lapboard ultimately launched in 2008.

== See also ==
- Steam Machine
- Indrema
- ApeXtreme
- Coleco Chameleon
- Piposh Hollywood, a video game that Phantom Entertainment was set to publish.
