= APF-MP1000 =

Second-generation home video game console

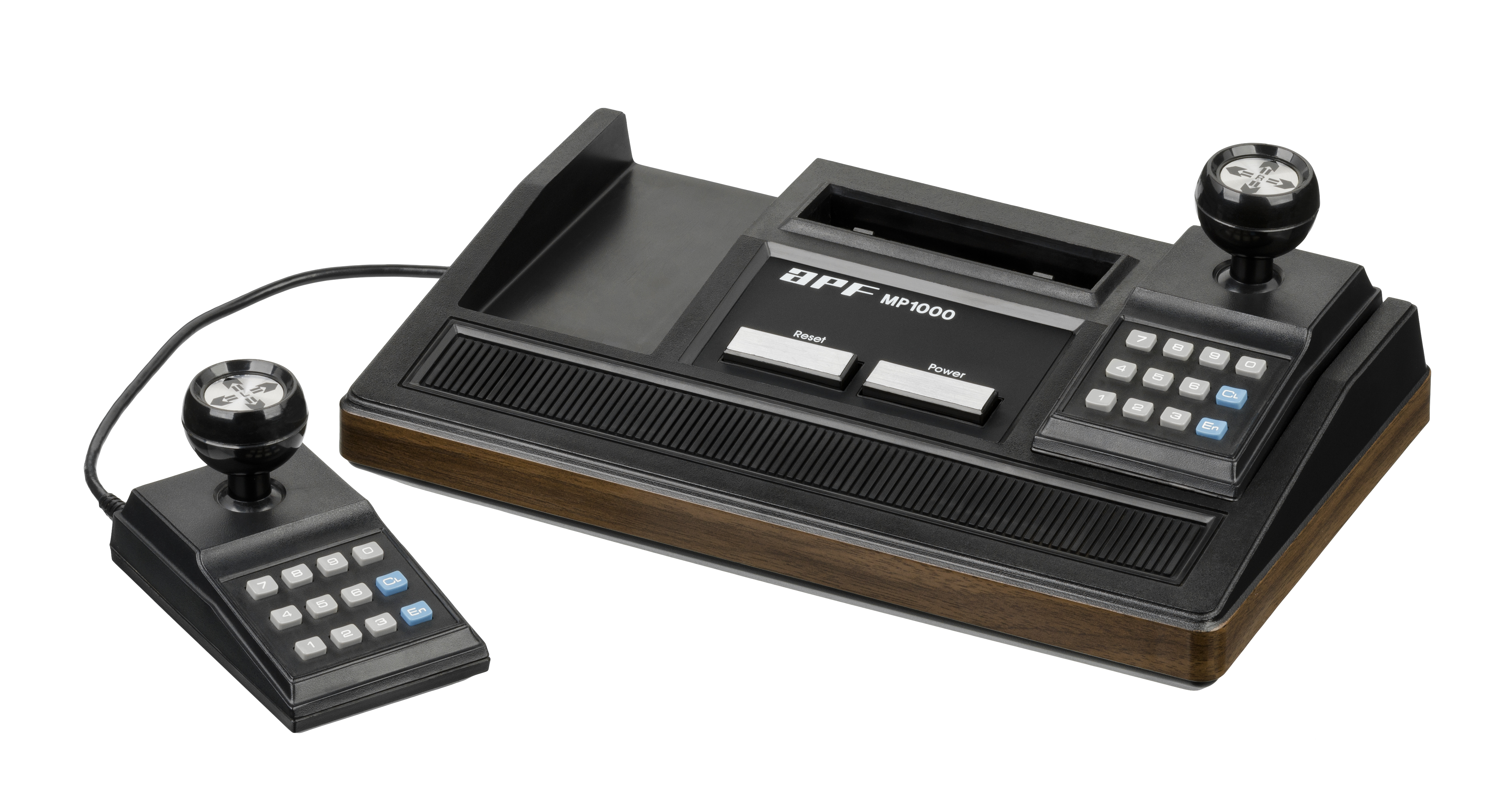
- Also known as: M-1000; MP-1000
- Manufacturer: APF Electronics Inc.
- Type: Home video game console
- Generation: Second generation
- Released: October 1978; 47 years ago
- Units sold: Around 50,000 at a minimum
- Media: Cartridges
- CPU: Motorola 6800 (8 bit) @ 0.895 MHz (3.579 MHz oscillator divided by 4)
- Memory: 1 KB RAM
- Graphics: 256 x 192 (8 colors)
- Power: 7.5 V AC 0.8 A or 12 V DC 0.5 A
- Predecessor: APF TV Fun series

The APF Microcomputer System is a second generation 8-bit cartridge-based home video game console released in October 1978 by APF Electronics Inc. with six cartridges. The console is often referred to M-1000 or MP-1000, which are the two model numbers of the console. The APF-MP1000 comes built-in with the game Rocket Patrol. The APF-MP1000 is a part of the APF Imagination Machine. The APF-MP1000 and the APF Imagination Machine were developed in part by the noted engineer Ed Smith.

It is the successor to the APF TV Fun line of first generation consoles.

== Technical specifications ==
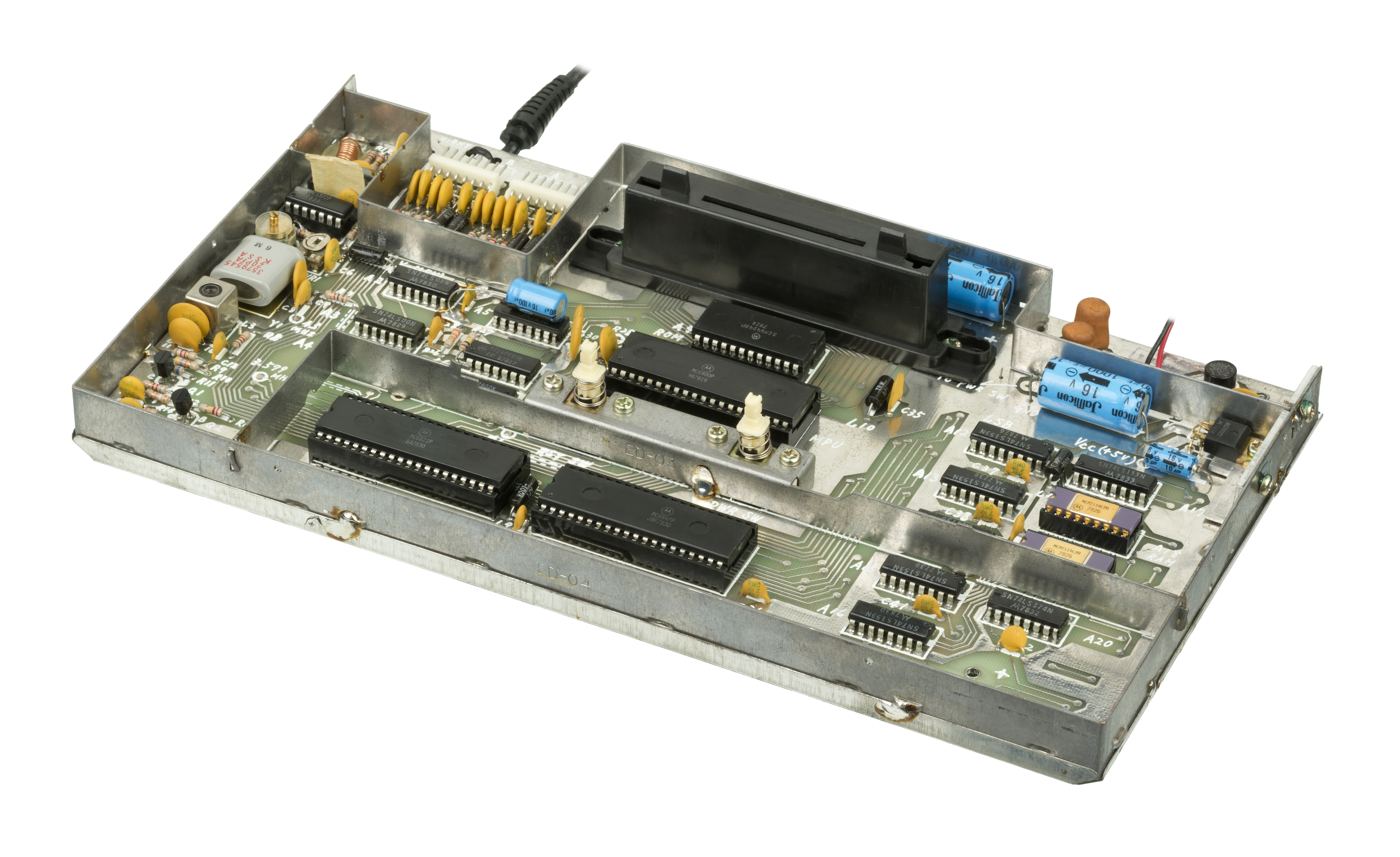
The APF MP1000 was the only second generation video game console based on the Motorola 6800 processor.

- CPU: Motorola 6800 (8 bit) @ 0.895 MHz (3.579 MHz oscillator divided by 4)
- RAM: 1 KB
- Video Display Controller: MC6847
- Palette : 8 colors
- Resolutions: 256×192×4 / 128×192×8
- Power Supply: 7.5 V AC 0.8 A or 12 V DC 0.5 A

== Cartridge list ==
Some APF-M1000 games

| Serial | Game |
|---|---|
| MG1008 | Backgammon |
| MG1006 | Baseball |
| MG1007 | Blackjack |
| MG1004 | Bowling/Micro Match |
| MG1012 | Boxing |
| MG1005 | Brickdown/Shooting Gallery |
| MG1009 | Casino I: Roulette/Keno/Slots |
| MG1001/MG1002 | Catena |
| MG1003 | Hangman/Tic Tac Toe/Doodle |
| MG1011 | Pinball/Dungeon Hunt/Blockout |
| Built-In | Rocket Patrol |
| MG1013 | Space Destroyers |
| MG1010 | UFO/Sea Monster/Break It Down/Rebuild/Shoot |
