= APF Electronics =

American video game developer and video game console manufacturer

APF Electronics Inc.
- Industry: Consumer electronics, video games
- Headquarters: Queens, NY
- Key people: Al Friedman, Phil Friedman, Ed Smith, Steve Lipper, Harry Cox, Howard Boylen, Kenny Boylen

APF Electronics Inc. was a publicly traded company in the United States dedicated to consumer electronics. The company's name comes from the initials of the two brothers who founded the company, Al & Phil Friedman.

== History ==
The company was founded to import stereos from Japan to the U.S., specifically quadraphonic sets and 8-track player. They moved into calculators.

APF had locations in Queens, NY where they were headquartered, and in Hong Kong, where they owned a factory. In all, APF employed 300 people.

== Products ==
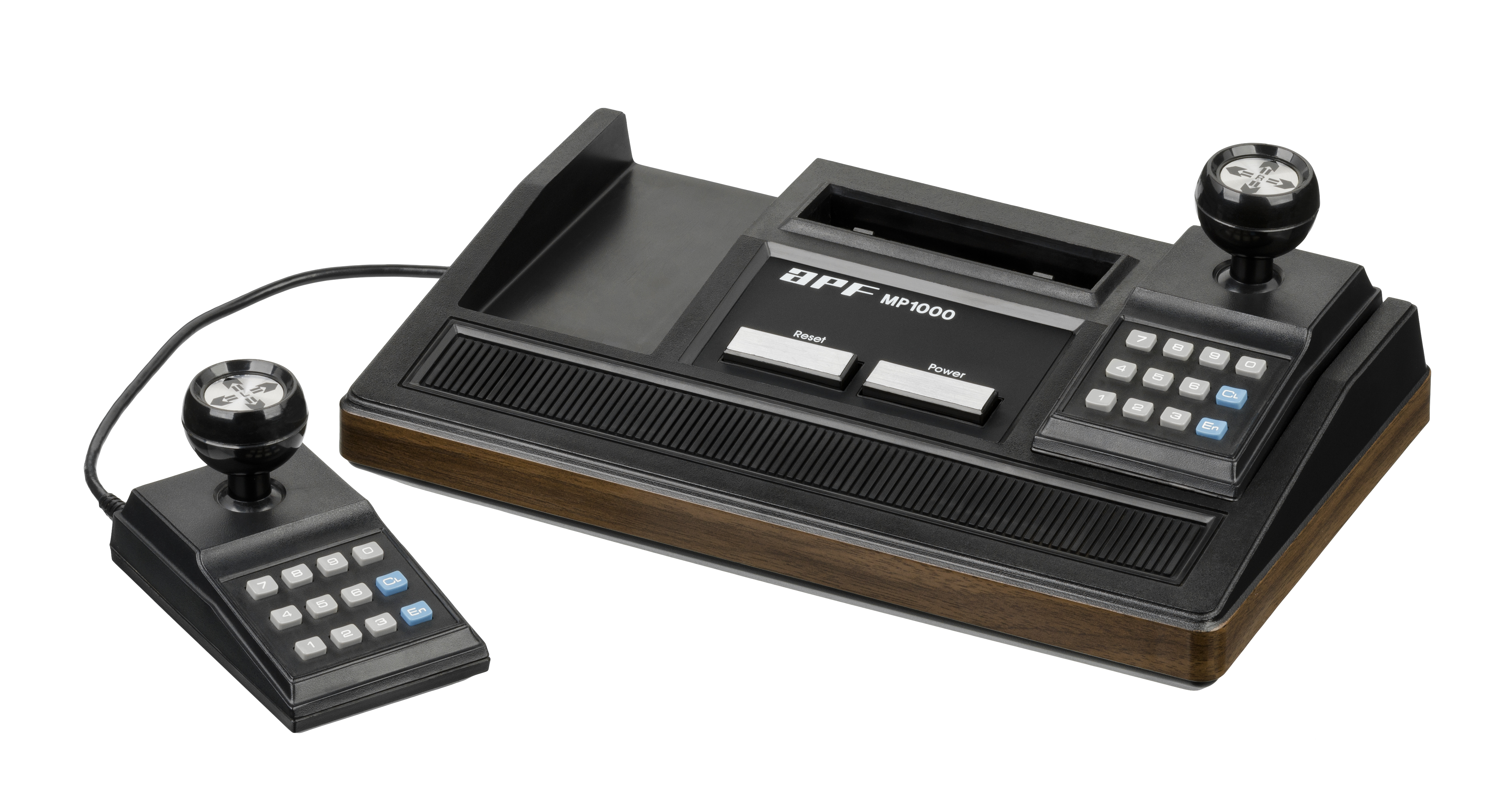
The APF MP1000 was the company's second game console, released in 1978.

APF marketed calculators in the early 1970s. Models such as the Mark III and Mark V had LED displays and used C batteries.

APF TV Fun was a series of classic first generation video game consoles. It is one of the first system based on the common AY-3-8500 chipset from General Instrument. There are TV Fun Model 401A and TV Fun Sportsarama. The series was first available in 1976.

APF-MP1000, also called M-1000, was a second generation video game console released in 1978 at a price of $130 (~$642.00 in 2025). Twelve cartridges were released in addition to the built-in game Rocket Patrol.

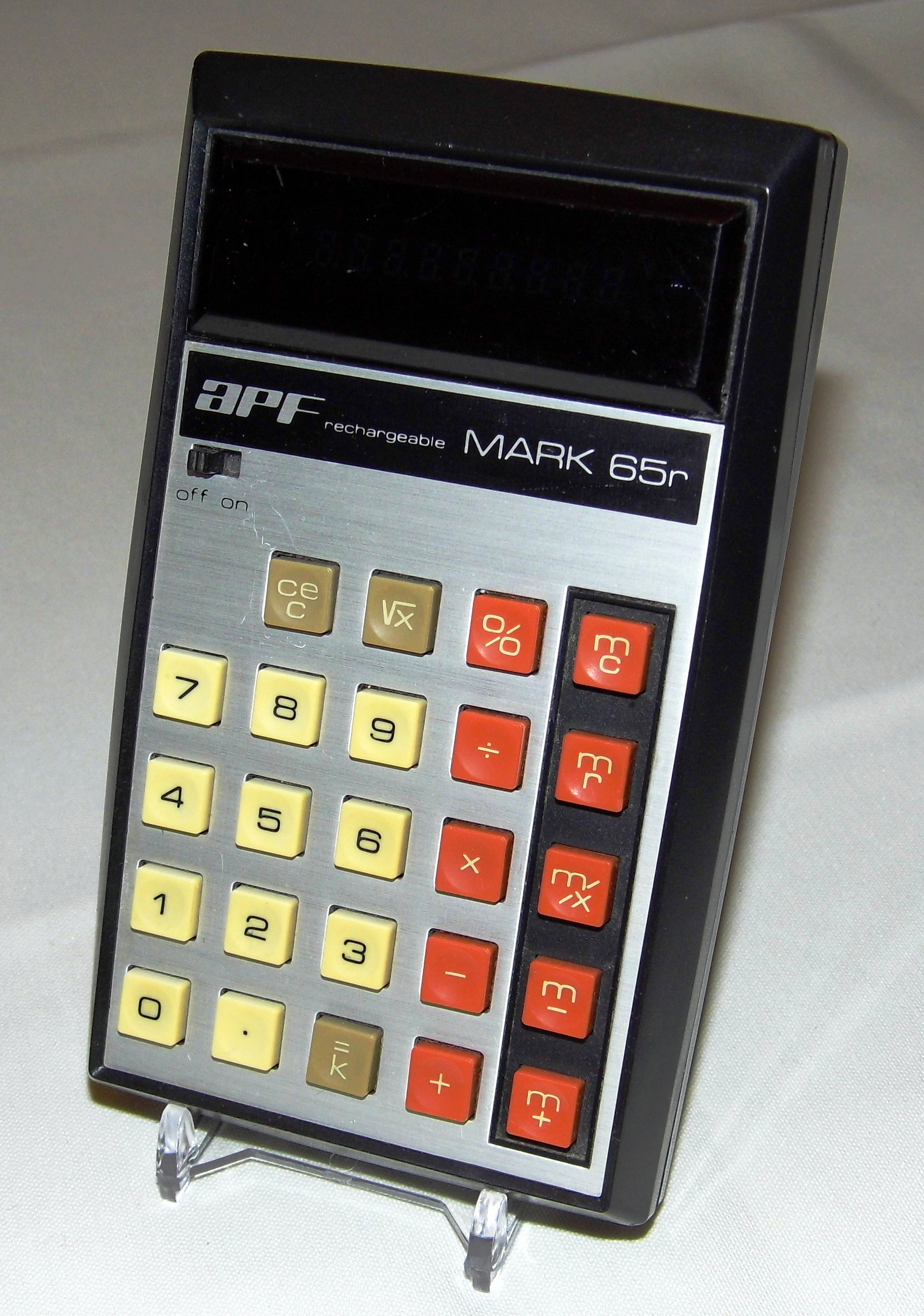
An APF calculator

APF PeCos One was a computer system released in 1978. The name stood for "Personal Computing System." It came equipped with two built-in tape drives and a monitor. Instead of using BASIC it used a proprietary language called PeCos 1, which was a version of JOSS.

APF Imagination Machine was a computer module released in 1979 for $599 (~$2,657 in 2025). When combined with the M-1000 console it became a computer. The module added RAM, BASIC, a 53-key typewriter keyboard, and a dual-track cassette tape deck with 1500 baud rate for digitally recorded tape programs. The specifications were the result of reverse engineering several popular computers at the time.

APF Mathemagician is a tabletop handheld calculator game released in 1980. By itself, it's a math learning tool and standard calculator, but it has 6 different overlays that convert it into one of several games.

APF Imagination Machine II was a computer-video game console hybrid that was in the final development stages around 1983. It was more powerful and was an all-in-one unit. The project was cancelled. It is unknown if any prototypes exist.

== Bankruptcy ==
The video game crash of 1983 caused the APF Imagination Machine II project to be cancelled and APF, by then a publicly traded company, filed for bankruptcy.
