= ZAPiT Games =

Canadian video game company

ZAPiT Games, Inc.
- Company type: Private
- Founded: Mississauga, Ontario, (2003)
- Headquarters: Mississauga, Ontario, Canada
- Products: Game Wave Family Entertainment System
- Website: ZAPiT Games

ZAPiT Games, Inc. was a Canadian company based in Mississauga, Ontario. It was formed in 2003 to create a family oriented home video game console. To that goal, it partnered with companies such as National Semiconductor, Panasonic and Altera to create the Game Wave Family Entertainment System.

ZAPiT Games also produces games for the BlackBerry and iPhone.

The console system and the company closed in 2009.

== Game Wave Family Entertainment System ==
The Game Wave Family Entertainment System is hybrid DVD player and video game console of the seventh generation of video game consoles and was first released in October 2005. The games on the system are trivia based or video variants of traditional board or card games.
