= John Gildred =

American entrepreneur and business executive

- Born: John Taylor Gildred; August 23, 1970 (age 56); San Diego, California, US
- Education: UCLA
- Occupations: VP Product Intertrust; Founder, Investor AVB.io; Co-Owner, Investor SG Investments
- Years active: 1994–present
- Spouse: Yana Kushner (m. 1999)
- Children: Maxim Gildred; Joshua Gildred; Finn Gildred
- Parent(s): Theodore E. Gildred; Suzanne G. Gildred

John Taylor Gildred (born August 23, 1970) is an American entrepreneur and business executive known for his work in consumer electronics and online media technology. Gildred originally established his reputation in 1994 at OpenSoft, an Internet communications software company. Later in 1999, Gildred became well known as the founder of Indrema, a consumer electronics company which developed, but ultimately never released, a highly anticipated Linux-based game console for independent game developers. Gildred cited a receding market for venture capital in 2001 as a primary factor in the decision to cancel mass production of the game system. After Indrema, Gildred joined Pioneer Electronics to head product development for digital television and Blu-ray as well as Pioneer's Advanced Technology Group. While at Pioneer, he formed a subsidiary named SyncTV, a multi-CE company initiative to provide over-the-top television service to all TV manufacturers. In 2009 SyncTV was sold to Intertrust Technologies.
