= Apex Digital =

American electronics company

Apex Digital, Inc.
- Type: Private
- Industry: Consumer electronics
- Founded: 1997; 29 years ago
- Headquarters: Chino, CA
- Key people: David Ji
- Number of employees: 50

Apex Digital, Inc. is an American electronics trading company based in Walnut, California founded in 1997. It distributed high definition and LCD panel televisions, DVD recorders and players, and other digital items including photo frames and bookshelf audio systems. It also has an office in Ontario, California. In 2010, Apex filed for Chapter 11 bankruptcy, which finally closed in 2018.

== History ==
=== 1997-2003 ===
Apex Digital, Inc. was co-founded in 1997 by David Ji (President), Wasim (CEO), and Ancle Hsu (Chief Operating Officer). In 2000, it introduced its first DVD players – the AD-600A – to the US market, which became successful due to their ability to play MP3 files; used to download music files off the internet during the height of the Napster controversy. By the end of 2001, Apex was the second leading marketer of DVD players in the US after Sony.

In 2001, Apex became the first company certified to produce DVD players compatible with Eastman Kodak’s picture CDs and its ViDVD player enabled users to connect to the internet.

In 2001, Ji reached an agreement on behalf of Apex with the Chinese company Sichuan Changhong Electric (Changhong). Changhong was China's largest television manufacturer, a supplier majority-owned by the company-town city of Mianyang and the province of Sichuan. The company provided two-thirds of the city of Mianyang's revenue, and Changhong's chairman and managing director Zhao Yong was until late 2004 the city's deputy mayor. Changhong became Apex's largest supplier of DVD players.

In 2002, Apex became the top brand of DVD player in the United States. Apex also began selling Changhong-made television sets. Apex introduced new products in 2002, including a DVD player with a built-in hard drive for downloading TV programs and a range of television sets. In 2003, the company held 17% of the US DVD player market and began selling 42-inch HD plasma screen TVs and LCD monitors. Stephen Brothers, who originally led sales and marketing efforts, was named president in September of that year. Apex sales rose to almost $2 billion in 2003.

=== 2004-05 ===
In 2004, Apex had $1 billion in sales. In January 2004, Apex introduced the "ApeXtreme" console for playing PC video games on a television screen. The system was cancelled in December that year. During this period, Ji was arrested in China on fraud charges against Changhong.

On October 23, 2004, as Apex was in a business dispute with Changhong in which the two companies argued over hundreds of millions of dollars, as Ji was in China on a business trip he was arrested by Mianyang police in his hotel room in Shenzhen, China, near Hong Kong, 500 miles away from Shenzhen. Changhong accused Ji of defrauding them through bad checks. He was held in China by Changhong for months without charges. Ji was taken to Sichuan, where he was handed over to Changhong, which kept him in a makeshift jail.

On his fifth day there, he was placed on the phone with a Washington D.C. lawyer named Charlie Wang (Wang Xiaoling, in Chinese), of the American law firm Cadwalader, Wickersham & Taft, who accused Ji of committing fraud and said that Ji's only way out was to sign documents that Wang would deliver to him that would help Changhong recover missing funds. Ji was then presented with legal documents for his signature that pledged all of Apex's assets as well as Ji's personal assets to Changhong to settle a claimed $470 million debt. Ji initially refused. A guard then asked Ji, "Do you want this pen, or do you want your hand?", as the guard made a motion of chopping off his hand. Ji signed the papers. On December 14, 2004, Changhong sued Apex in Los Angeles County Superior Court, alleging breach of contract and citing the documents Ji had signed. Apex contested the suit, stating that Ji had been abducted and that the documents had been signed under coercion.

In order to create an argument that Ji was not in fact a hostage, Charlie Wang, the Cadwalader lawyer for Changhong, deposed Ji on videotape. Ji did not have a lawyer; Apex later argued that that raised questions as to whether the tape would have any value in American courts. At the deposition, Ji disputed Changhong's version of events; this led to a heated argument between Ji and Charlie Wang, according to people who saw the deposition. The following day, Ji was taken to meet Mr. Zhao, Changhong's head. Zhao warned Ji that Changhong controlled the Mianyang courts, that Ji would be tried in those courts, and that Changhong would decide if he lived or died. Charlie Wang then conducted a second taped deposition of Ji. In response to everything Wang asked Ji, Ji muttered agreement, including that Changhong had "invited" him to stay at its apartment in Shanghai.

Apex then complained that Cadwalader lawyer Charlie Wang had acted improperly and unethically by being a party to Ji' detention. Cadwalader subsequently withdrew from the case. Charlie Wang, who had been made a Cadwalader partner just a few months earlier, left the firm.

On May 28, 2005, seven months after Ji was first detained, he was handed over to the Mianyang police for formal arrest on charges of "financial instrument fraud." In June 2015, Apex acknowledged a $150 million debt, but the debt remained unpaid as Apex said it did not have any money. In August 2015, the police released Ji on restricted bail, without him being indicted.

=== 2006-present ===
In 2010, Apex filed for Chapter 11 bankruptcy, which finally closed in January 2018.

However, as of 2026, the California Secretary of State Bizfile online website has stated that Apex Digital is an active business.

In 2019, Apex Digital entered a partnership with Bluestar Alliance, a private equity firm, to purchase Brookstone's online and wholesale businesses. Brookstone is a retail chain that filed for Chapter 11 bankruptcy in 2018.

== Controversies ==
A programming loophole in Apex's first DVD player model meant that users could circumvent regional lockout and Macrovision's copyright protection, meaning they could play DVDs from any region globally and record them onto videocassettes. Apex quickly discontinued the model, and this problem was resolved in subsequent manufacturing.

Apex agreed to pay Philips, Sony and Pioneer a $7 patent royalty fee for every DVD player it produced, following a copyright infringement suit in 2002.

== Acquisitions and partnerships ==
From 2002 Apex developed its range of televisions in partnership with Sichuan Changhong Electric Co. Ltd, China's largest manufacturer of colour televisions.
