= Game Wave Family Entertainment System =

Home video game console and DVD-Player

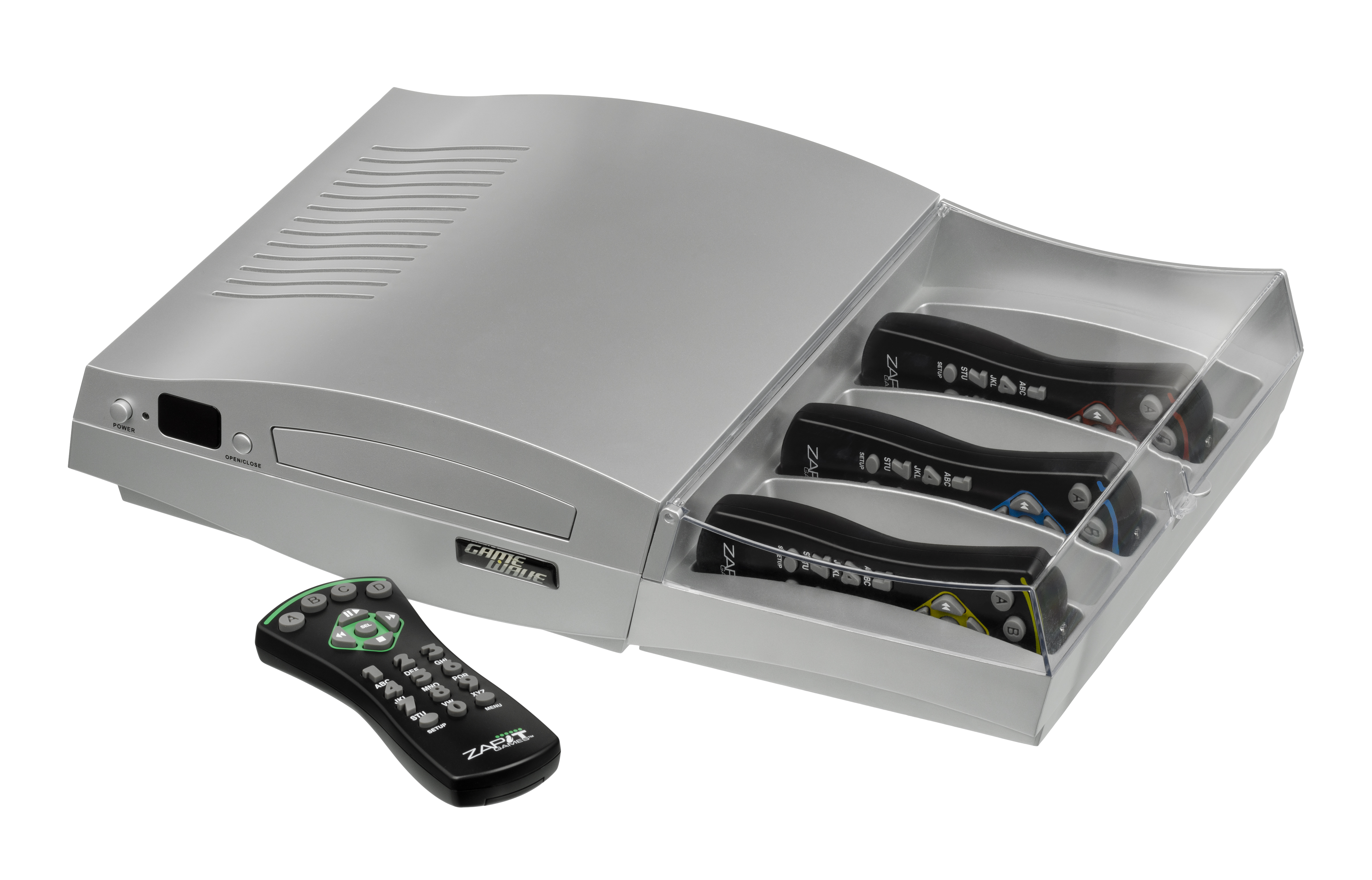
- Manufacturer: ZAPiT Games
- Type: DVD player
- Generation: Seventh
- Released: October 2005
- Lifespan: 2005–2009
- Discontinued: 2009
- Units sold: Ca. 70,000 (as of 2008)
- Media: DVD-ROM
- CPU: Mediamatics 8611
- Memory: 16 megabytes (SRAM)
- Storage: 2 megabytes NOR flash storage, serial EEPROM
- Online services: None
- Predecessor: None
- Language: Lua

The Game Wave Family Entertainment System, commonly abbreviated as Game Wave, is a hybrid DVD player and home video game console manufactured by ZAPiT Games. It is part of the seventh generation of video game consoles.

== History ==
In October 2004 the first Game Wave prototype system was made.

It was first released in Canada in October 2005. It was released in the United States at an MSRP of $99. It was packaged with the pack-in game 4 Degrees: The Arc of Trivia, Vol. 1 (later changed to VeggieTales: Veg-Out! Family Tournament).

Because of the use of family friendly games and a partnership with VeggieTales, the system found some success with Christian households.

The system was discontinued in 2009. A followup console had been planned for 2009.

== Hardware ==
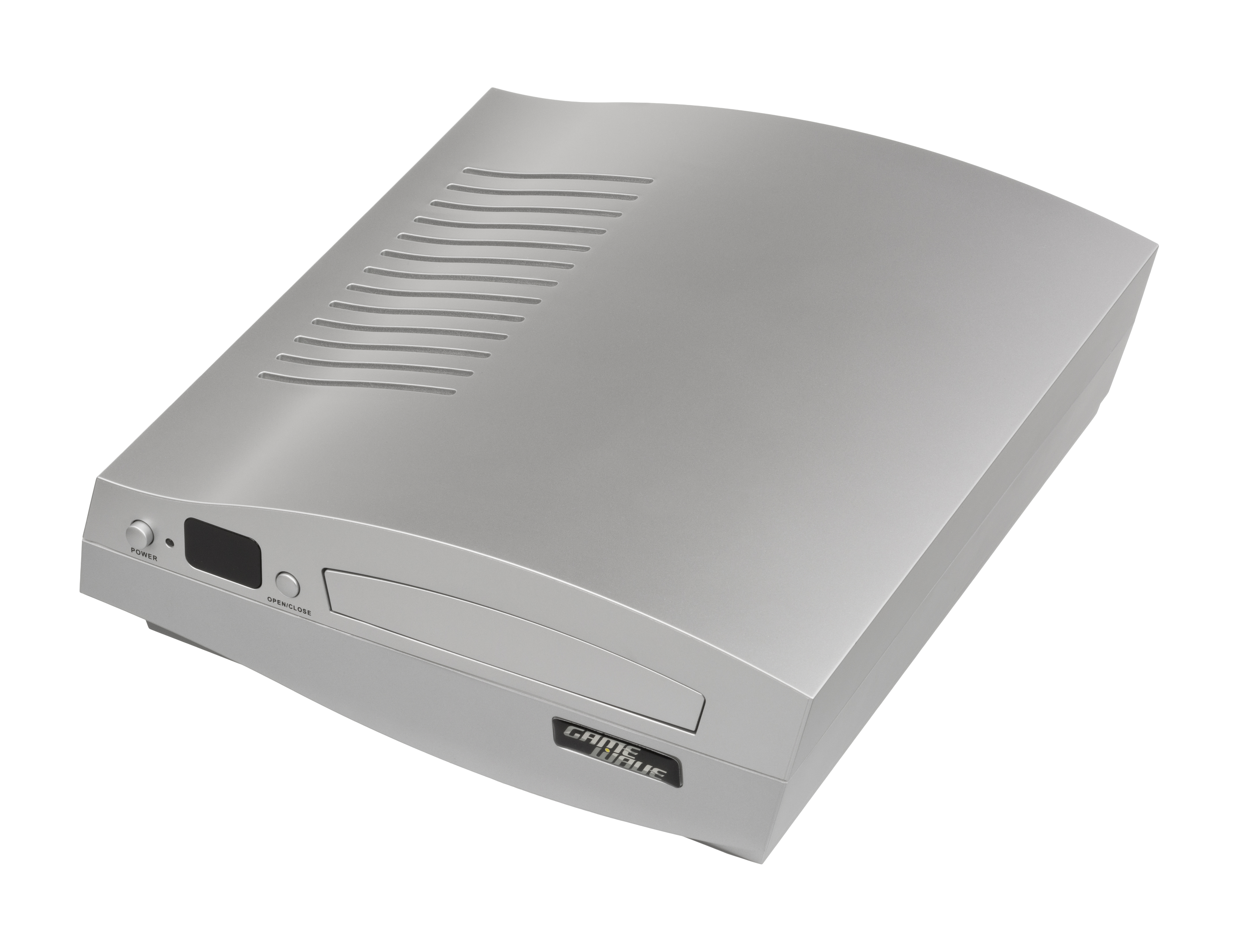
The Game Wave console could be disconnected from the controller caddy.

The Game Wave was packaged with both RCA and S-Video cables, along with 4 IR-based wireless controllers (modeled after typical DVD remote controllers) and a case that holds up to 6 controllers. The case and console are designed to sit side-by-side on a shelf to form a complete wave shape.

The primary processor of the system is the Mediamatics 8611, which is coupled with 16 megabytes of SRAM and 2 megabytes of NOR flash memory storage. An Altera MAX II CPLD is also used. An Atmel serial EEPROM is used for save data. The system uses a dedicated 2 channel audio DAC in order to avoid royalties for the one integrated in the Mediamatics processor.

Game software for the Game Wave Family Entertainment System is typically scripted in Lua.

The system can operate as a typical DVD player.

=== Controllers ===
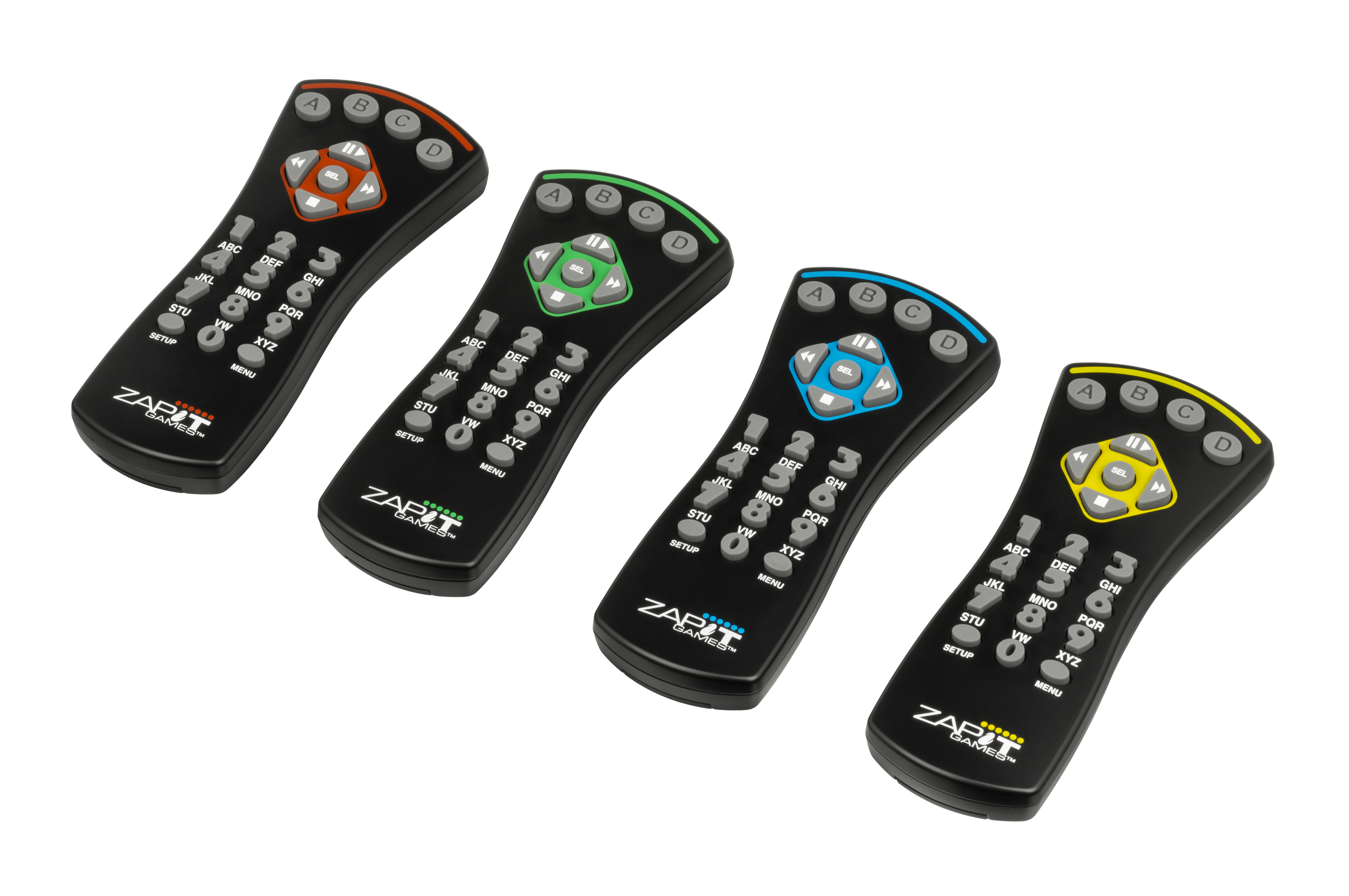
The Game Wave shipped with four color coded remote controls that double as game controllers.

The Game Wave controller has 4-directional navigational buttons used for menu navigation and DVD playback control. The controller has 4 alphabetical buttons along the top labeled "A", "B", "C", and "D" designed primarily for selecting responses in trivia games. A numeric keypad lines the bottom of the controller with Menu and Setup buttons.

The Game Wave controllers came in 6 colors: blue, yellow, green, red, purple, and orange. Blue, yellow, green, and red come packaged with the console, whereas the purple and orange controllers could be purchased separately for an MSRP of $30. Each controller color has a different IR beat frequency, allowing the console to differentiate the different controllers for multiplayer gameplay for up to 6 players (if the game in question supports it).

== Games ==
Due to the shape of the controller and marketing concerns for a "Family Entertainment System," no heavily action-based game genres are present within the Game Wave's 13 game library. Rather, the software library consists mainly of trivia and puzzle games. In addition, many Game Wave games are heavily inspired by other video games and TV shows. A 14th game, Quiz Konnect was developed for the India market.

Title	Released	Genre	Inspired by
4 Degrees: The Arc of Trivia, Bible Edition	2006	Trivia	Trivial Pursuit
4 Degrees: The Arc of Trivia, Vol. 1	2006	Trivia	Trivial Pursuit
4 Degrees: The Arc of Trivia, Vol. 2	2006	Trivia	Trivial Pursuit
Click!	2007	Word	Wheel of Fortune
Gemz	2007	Puzzle	Bejeweled
Letter Zap!	2006	Word	Boggle
Lock 5	2006	Strategy	Yahtzee
Rewind	2005	Trivia	N/A
Rewind 2005	2006	Trivia	N/A
Rewind 2006	2006	Trivia	N/A
Sudoku	October 2007	Puzzle	Sudoku
VeggieTales: Veg-Out! Family Tournament	December 10, 2007	Minigame collection	Mario Party
Zap 21	2006	Card	Blackjack
Quiz Konnect	2010	Trivia	Trivial Pursuit
