= APF Imagination Machine =

Hybrid computer-console by APF in 1979

- Manufacturer: APF Electronics Inc.
- Type: Home video game console, home computer
- Generation: Second generation
- Released: November 1979; 46 years ago
- Introductory price: US$700 (equivalent to $3,110 in 2025)
- Media: Cartridges, cassette tape
- CPU: Motorola 6800 8-bit @ 0.89 MHz (3.579 MHz Oscillator divided by 4)
- Memory: 9 KB RAM (expandable to 17 KB (8 KB / 16 KB + 1 KB)), 14 KB ROM
- Graphics: Video Display Controller MC6847 @ 256×192×4, 128×192×8
- Sound: One sound channel in 5 octaves

The APF Imagination Machine is a combination home video game console and home computer system released by APF Electronics Inc. in late 1979. It has two separate components, the APF-M1000 game system, and an add-on docking bay with full sized typewriter keyboard and tape drive. The APF-M1000 was built specifically to compete with the Atari 2600. The full APF Imagination Machine, including the APF-M1000 console and the IM-1 computer component, originally sold for around US$599 (equivalent to $2,660 in 2025).

== Specifications ==
- CPU: 8-bit 0.89 MHz Motorola 6800 (3.579 MHz Oscillator divided by 4)
- ROM: 14 KB
- RAM: 9 KB expandable to 17 KB (8 KB / 16 KB + 1 KB)
- Video Display Controller: MC6847
- Resolutions: 256×192×4 / 128×192×8
- Colors: 8
- One sound channel in 5 octaves
- Two controllers:
  - 13 buttons
    - 0-9 numeric keypad
    - Clear and End key
    - Trigger
  - 4-way joystick

== Overview ==
=== APF Basic ===
The bundled APF BASIC interpreter allows users to develop custom programs. Retailers provided an instruction manual explaining the programming language and a technical sheet detailing the console's chip functions to assist with programming. To encourage users to create and trade games, a monthly mailing list operated through the video game crash of 1983 and into the subsequent console generation.

=== Special cassette ===
One of the most marketed features of the console is the dual-sided cassette drive that allows the user to write or use a stored program, and also to record or play audio. The feature is generally used for programmers to leave notes about their work, or for instructions to be read aloud before a game is played.

=== Peripherals ===
The console has a number of aftermarket add-ons:

- RS-232 Storage Cartridge
- Floppy Disk Storage
- 8K RAM Cartridge
- Mini Floppy Disk Storage
- Telephone Modem

It has a hub of sorts, generally called the "building block", which allows for the connection of some standard computer accessories.

== Games ==
In addition to the one BASIC interpreter cartridge bundled with the system, only 15 official game cartridges were ever released by APF Electronics Inc, although several cartridges contain multiple games. Many games were created by an active programming community of owners and distributed through the monthly newsletter, released on cassette tape or printout.

The official game list is as follows:

- Artist and Easel
- Backgammon
- Baseball
- Blackjack
- Bowling / Micro Match
- Boxing
- Brickdown / Shooting Gallery
- Budget Manager
- Casino
- Catena
- Hangman / Tic-Tac-Toe / Doodle
- Pinball / Dungeon Hunt / Blockout
- Rocket Patrol
- Space Destroyers
- UFO / Sea Monster / Break it down / Rebuild / Shoot

== APF IM-2 console ==
APF had planned on releasing a follow-up to the original M1000 Imagination Machine game console, but APF went bankrupt in 1983 due to the Video Game Crisis Of '83, before the console could go to market. No official specs have ever been released, although some former employees have mentioned that it was essentially the same M1000 core with typical upgrades.

== Development ==
The impetus for the Imagination Machine was to beat to market Atari's preannounced but never-launched plans to extend the Atari 2600 to become a home computer. The design was inspired by reverse engineering the TRS-80, Commodore PET, and Apple II home computers. Working directly with Fairchild Semiconductor, the team got much of its I/O design from Andy Grove. The engineering department wanted to make the design modular for optional expansion, but the marketing department wanted to bundle some features, so the preliminary result was an integrated cassette tape drive. This was removed when, three months later, the first floppy drives appeared on the market which were a superior storage technology.

== Reception ==
Games magazine said in mid-1980, "APF's hardware is impressively solid in both design and performance, and if you're not ready to plunk down $600, you can buy just the game system (MP 1000) for $130 and decide later if you really want the computer component. But it's the whole system that's exciting. If what you want is just a video game, you may as well stick with Atari." Mechanix Illustrated in October 1980 called the system "one smart television that's inexpensive, completely programmable, and easy to use". The magazine praised its large RAM and ROM capacities, and called it the first computer that can let the user store new data on the same cassette as the application.
