= Indrema =

Defunct consumer electronics company

Indrema Corporation
- Company logo.
- Trade name: Indrema Entertainment Systems
- Industry: Consumer electronics Video games
- Founded: January 2000
- Defunct: April 6, 2001
- Headquarters: Alameda, California, United States

Indrema Corporation, also known as Indrema Entertainment Systems, was a consumer electronics company famous for the Indrema L600 Entertainment System, a game console intended for independent game developers.

Officially founded in 2000 by John Gildred, Indrema's goal was to create a video game console based on common PC hardware and the Linux operating system. The console would have been the only open source console on the market, as well as the only modern console to allow free software to be written for it. An early developer unit was featured running Quake in the Indrema booth at LinuxWorld earlier in 2000.

The console was expected to be released by the holiday season of 2000, which was later postponed to summer 2001 or a later date. Those subscribed to Indrema's mailing list received a "top ten" list in the style of David Letterman in anticipation of the launch announcement that ridiculed its competition.

After being unable to raise enough capital to mass-produce the console, Indrema shut down on April 6, 2001. In his last Indrema chat session, Gildred revealed that the company needed more than $10,000,000 in capital in order to continue and gave the following advice to the next video game startup: "finish product before talking about it."

== L600 ==
A prototype of the L600 console.

The L600, also known as the Indrema Entertainment System, was to be a Linux-based game console/computer and was in the process of being developed by Indrema until they ceased operations in April 2001. Development for the console began in March 1999. Besides game play, it was also to be a CD player, DVD player, web browser, and TiVo-like video recorder. It also would have been an MP3 storage device.

Had the console been released, it would have cost US$299 and would have had 30 games available at launch. It would have had 64MB of system RAM and 96MB of total memory. Its storage was a 10GB hard drive (which could be upgraded to 50GB) and its games would be on DVD-9 discs and CD-R. It would have had HDTV support at resolutions up to 1080i. Indrema would have let regular end-users develop their games via their development kit, unlike other companies, which charge more than $10,000 USD for their kits. It would allow the user to upgrade their graphics processing unit via the "GPU Slide Bay", and had an x86-based processor running at 600 MHz, which was later upgraded to a 750 MHz AMD Duron processor, and its GeForce 3 GPU would have been able to process 120-180 million polygons per second.

There was little hope for the L600, however, as its speculated release date was after the launch of Sega's Dreamcast and Sony's PlayStation 2, and very near or after the release of Microsoft's Xbox and Nintendo's GameCube. The Dreamcast and GameCube had launched at considerably lower prices, and PlayStation 2 and Xbox at the same speculated US$299 despite having bigger budgets and less advanced hardware than the L600 was supposed to have, leading to doubts. It was just one of many independently developed systems that would be unable to take consumer attention and spending from more established, previously mentioned companies already in the market.

== See also ==
- Infinium Phantom
- ApeXtreme
