= Coleco Telstar Marksman =

Home video game consoles by Coleco

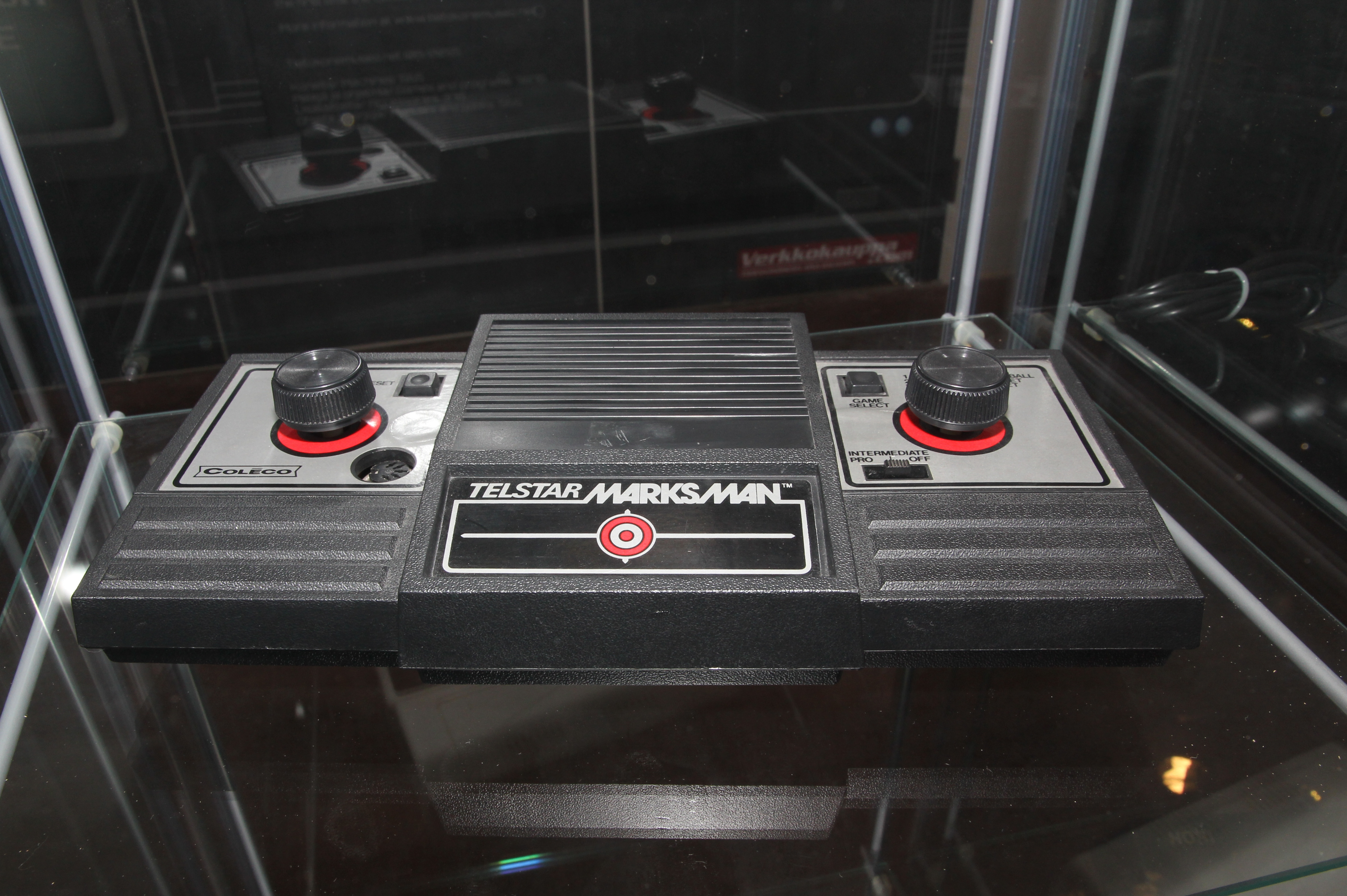
- A Coleco Telstar Marksman
- Also known as: Telstar Marksman
- Developer: Coleco
- Manufacturer: Coleco
- Type: Dedicated home video game console
- Generation: First generation
- Released: 1978; 48 years ago
- Units sold: Unknown
- Units shipped: Unknown
- CPU: General Instrument AY-3-8512 chipset
- Display: GX-10
- Graphics: 4 simultaneously displayed colors
- Sound: One channel beeper
- Input: RF TV video output, Gun connector
- Controller input: Two paddle controllers built-in, a light gun
- Power: Two x nine-volt batteries, (Optional Coleco Perma Power AC adaptor)
- Dimensions: 2 × 11.25 × 5 inch (height x wide x depth)
- Weight: 21.0 lb
- Related: Coleco Telstar

The Coleco Telstar Marksman, commonly abbreviated as Telstar Marksman, is a first-generation home video game console that featured a light gun. It was released by Coleco in 1978. Because it had a manufacturer-set number of games, it is considered a dedicated console. It was part of the Coleco Telstar series Pong-based home video game consoles; it is essentially a Coleco Telstar Colortron bundled with a "3 in 1" light gun and two shooting games. The Marksman light gun is a pistol that features an attachable stock and barrel. It is similar in this regard to the later-released Stack Light Rifle and the Sega Menacer. The elongated barrel included a simple aiming sight. In addition to the light gun, the system featured two paddle controllers built directly into the console. Its reported features included "on-screen digital scoring" and three different difficulty settings (beginner, intermediate, pro). It required two nine-volt batteries or Coleco's Perma Power AC adaptor to power the system.

There was also a Sears-branded model called the Gunslinger II, which has a beige plastic shell instead of black, and an extra decal on the stock of the gun.

== Games ==
The console came bundled with six color games: Tennis, Hockey, Handball, Jai-Alai, Skeet and Target. The first four games are variations on Pong, The last two games are single player shooting games that utilized the light gun. All of the games are incredibly simple compared to the games of today or even the early 1980s. The sports games were minor variations on Pong, with differences in the number of paddles, players, and the main surface to bounce objects off of. Skeet consisted of aiming and shooting at a square that moved diagonally across the screen in one direction, while Target was a variation that made the same square bounce around on the screen.
