= Wonder Wizard =

Home video game console by General Home Products

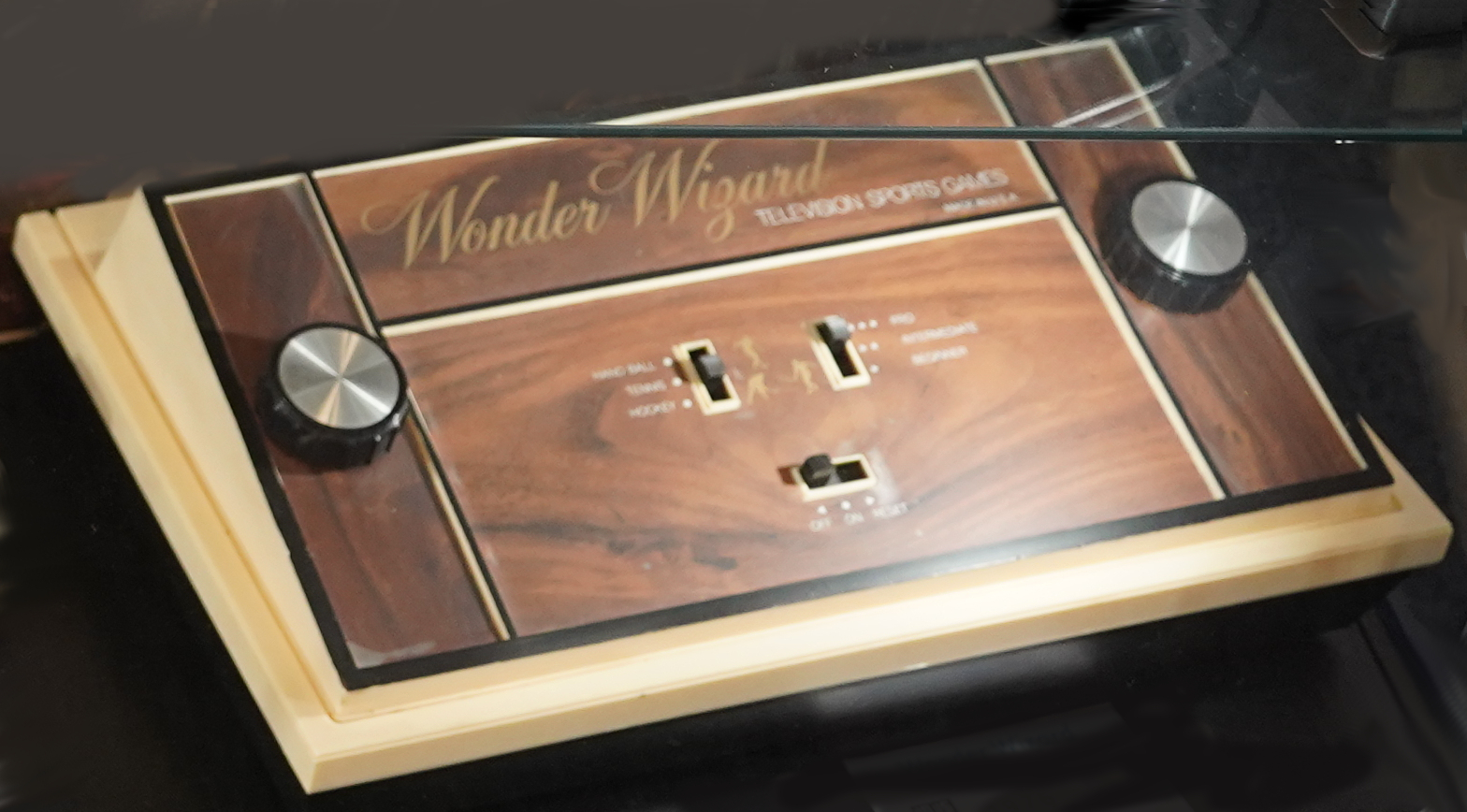
- A Wonder Wizard in a showcase
- Manufacturer: Magnavox, General Home Products
- Type: Dedicated home video game console
- Generation: First generation
- Released: USA: June 1976
- CPU: AY-3-8500
- Graphics: Black & white
- Sound: Via internal speaker
- Controller input: 2 attached paddle-based game controllers
- Power: 9 V AC adapter (100 ma) or 6 x C batteries
- Dimensions: 14.5" x 9" x 4"

The Wonder Wizard (model number: 7702) is a dedicated first-generation home video game console which was manufactured by Magnavox and released by General Home Products (GHP) in June 1976 only in the United States.

The console features two paddle-based game controllers attached to the system and contains the same circuit board as the Magnavox Odyssey 300 and the same bottom part housing as the Magnavox Odyssey. The paddles are larger than those of the Odyssey 300.

The console had a dealer cost of $39 but initial retail price was set at $60 (compared to the MSRP of the Odyssey 300 at $70).

== Games ==
The system contains three built-in Pong-based games:

- Handball
- Tennis
- Hockey

Just like the Odyssey 300, the Wonder Wizard uses a switch so that the players can choose between the three preset difficulty levels.

== Technical specifications ==
- CPU: General Instrument AY-3-8500 ("Pong-on-a-Chip")
- Input: Two game controllers/game selection, difficulty (pro, intermediate, beginner), and power button (on/off/reset)
- Graphics: Monochrome
- Sound: Built-in speaker
- Dimensions: 14.5 by 9 by 4 inches (370 mm × 230 mm × 100 mm) (l x h x w)
- Power: 9 V AC adapter (100 ma) or 6 x C batteries

The switch box in the scope of delivery is the same as those of the Odyssey 100 to 4000. The top of the console was available in two versions: one with silver colored knobs and a woodgrain design in the upper section of the housing, and one with black knobs and a full woodgrain design.
