= Coleco Telstar series =

Series of home video game consoles

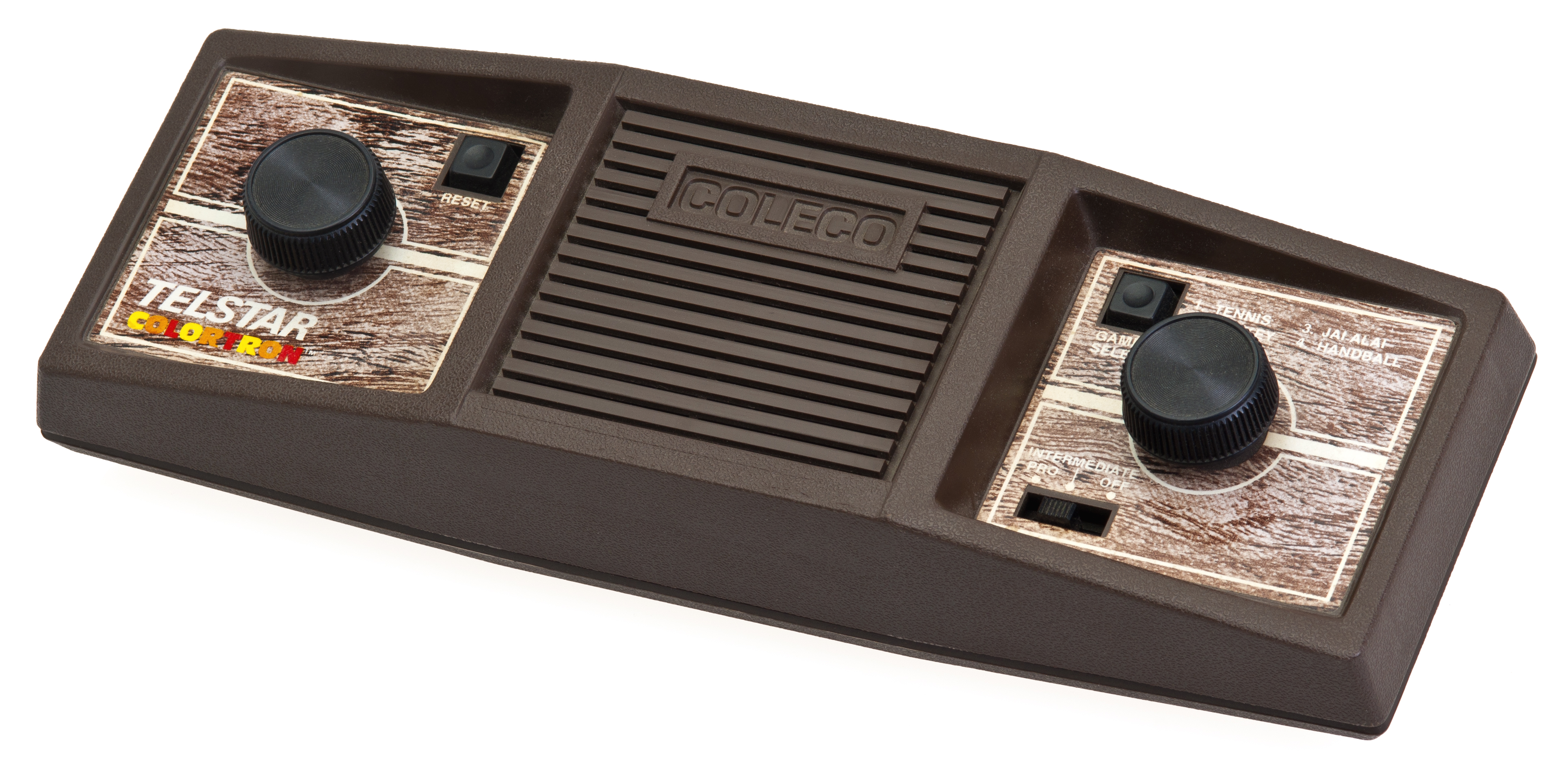
- A Coleco Telstar Colortron. A later model in the series.
- Manufacturer: Coleco
- Type: Series of dedicated home video game consoles
- Generation: First
- Released: c. June 1976
- Lifespan: 1976-1978
- Units sold: > 1 million (Coleco Telstar model only)
- Successor: ColecoVision

The Coleco Telstar is a series of dedicated first-generation home video game consoles produced, released and marketed by Coleco from 1976 to 1978. Starting with Coleco Telstar's Pong clone-based video game console on General Instrument's AY-3-8500 chip in 1976, there were 14 consoles released in the Coleco Telstar series. About one million units of the first model, called Coleco Telstar, were sold.

Coleco unveiled the first model at the National Sporting Goods Show in Chicago in early February 1976. Later that month, Coleco attended the Toy Fair in New York along with at least four other companies introducing dedicated home consoles, including Magnavox with the Odyssey 100 and 200. Coleco planned to start delivering product in April. In March, the FCC announced a variety of dedicated consoles, including the Telstar, had failed to meet its radio frequency interference standards. Coleco received FCC approval for its first two Telstar models, the Telstar and Telstar Classic, in May 1976. Both models began shipping to retailers soon afterwords.

Coleco initially sold the Telstar at $70 ($80 for the Telstar Classic model). Due to oversupply, it began selling for around $50 by August 1976. It sold over a million units in that year. Coleco was unaffected by a chip shortage that year, as their early orders meant it was entirely supplied. Coleco continued to release models into 1978, even as the dedicated home console market stalled and was replaced by handheld electronics. Coleco's revenue from the series fell by over 90% that year. By the end of the year, they had abandoned the product line. The first Telstar system included single control knobs for each player. It was sold as a bundle that contained the three internal ping pong style games Tennis, Hockey and Handball.

== Model comparison ==
Telstar models
| Console | Model and chip | Release date | Integrated games | Description | Size (height x wide x depth) | Cite | Picture |
|---|---|---|---|---|---|---|---|
| Coleco Telstar | No.6040, AY-3-8500 | 1976 | hockey; handball; tennis | Two fixed paddles. Games are Pong variants. | Unknown | | |
| Coleco Telstar Classic | No.6045, AY-3-8500 | 1976 | hockey; handball; tennis | Two fixed paddles. Deluxe wood case. | Unknown | | |
| Coleco Telstar Deluxe (a.k.a. "Video World of Sports") | model number unknown, AY-3-8500 | 1977 | hockey; handball; tennis | Two fixed paddles. Brown stand case with wood panel. Made for Canadian market with French and English text. | Unknown | | No picture available |
| Coleco Telstar Ranger | No.6046, AY-3-8500 | 1977 | hockey; handball; tennis; jai alai; target; skeet | Black and white plastic case, includes Colt 45-style light gun and separate paddle controllers. Four ball games, two target games. Special features of the four ball games include automatic serve and variable paddle and speed control for three experience levels (beginner, intermediate, and professional). Uses six C batteries or an optional AC adapter, light gun requires one nine-volt battery. | 4 lb. 17.5×6×8 in. | | |
| Coleco Telstar Alpha | No.6030, AY-3-8500 | 1977 | hockey; handball; tennis; squash | Black and white plastic case, fixed paddles. The games feature an automatic serve function and variable settings for three skill levels (beginner, intermediate, and pro). Uses six C batteries or optional 9 volt AC adapter. | 2.5 lb. 13.5×3.5×7.5 in. | | |
| Coleco Telstar Colormatic | No.6130, AY-3-8500; Texas Instruments SN76499N (color) | 1977 | hockey; handball; tennis; jai alai | Black and white plastic case, detached wired paddles. Color graphics - each game is a different color. The games feature an automatic serve function and variable settings for three skill levels (beginner, intermediate, and professional). Uses six C batteries. | 2.5 lb. 13×6.5×7.5 in. | | |
| Coleco Telstar Regent | No.6036, AY-3-8500 | 1977 | hockey; handball; tennis; jai alai | Black and white plastic case, detached wired paddles. The games feature an automatic serve function and variable settings for three skill levels (beginner, intermediate, and professional). Uses six C batteries. | 2.5 lb. 13.5×4×8 in. | | |
| Coleco Telstar Sportsman | model number unknown, AY-3-8500 | 1978 | | Black and white plastic case, detached wired paddles, and light gun. | Unknown | | No picture available |
| Coleco Telstar Combat! | No.6065, General Instrument AY-3-8700 Tank chip | 1977 | Combat; Night Battle; Robot Battle; Camouflage Combat | Four fixed joysticks (two per player). Games are variations on Kee Games' Tank. Uses six C batteries or an optional AC adapter. | 5.5 lb. 15×8×10.5 in. | | |
| Coleco Telstar Colortron | No.6135, AY-3-8510 | 1978 | Tennis; Hockey; Handball; Jai-alai | In color, built in sound, fixed paddles. Games are Pong variants and feature variable settings for three skill levels (beginner, intermediate, and pro). Uses two nine-volt batteries or an optional AC adapter. | 1 lb. 2×11.25×4 in. | | |
| Coleco Telstar Marksman | No.6136, AY-3-8512 | 1978 | Tennis; Hockey; Handball; Jai-alai; Skeet; Target | In color, larger light gun with removable stock, fixed paddles. Four Pong variants and two gun games. Uses two nine-volt batteries or an optional AC adapter. | 1 lb. 2×11.25×5 in. | | |
| Coleco Telstar Galaxy | model number unknown, AY-3-8600 (games); AY-3-8615 (color encoder) | 1977 | 48 variations of: Tennis; Hockey; Handball; Soccer; Basketball; Foosball | Separate joysticks and fixed paddles | Unknown | | No picture available |
| Coleco Telstar Gemini | model number unknown, MOS Technology MPS 7600-004 | 1977 | Four pinball games; Two light-gun games | In color, light gun, two flipper buttons on left and right sides of case, pinball launch button and field adjustment sliders on top, light gun. | Unknown | | No picture available |
| Coleco Telstar Arcade | model number 6175, MOS Technology MPS-7600 (each cart) | August 1977 | Pack-in game (Tennis, road racing, quick draw); Others: Eight-game ball and target cartridge; Five-game pinball and shooting cartridge; Battle game cartridge; Twenty-five game driving maze cartridge; Fifteen game action cartridge (including Break Thru) | Cartridge-based, triangular case includes light gun, steering wheel with gear shift, and paddles, one on each side. | 4 lb. 7.5×18×16 in. | | |

== Works cited ==
- Smith, Alexander (2019). They Create Worlds: The Story of the People and Companies That Shaped the Video Game Industry, Vol. I: 1971-1982. CRC Press. p. 414-417, 459-460, 466-469. ISBN 9781138389908.
- Wolf, Mark, ed. (2012). Before the Crash: Early Video Game History. Wayne State University Press. ISBN 9780814337226.
