= Coleco Telstar Arcade =

First-generation home video game console by Coleco

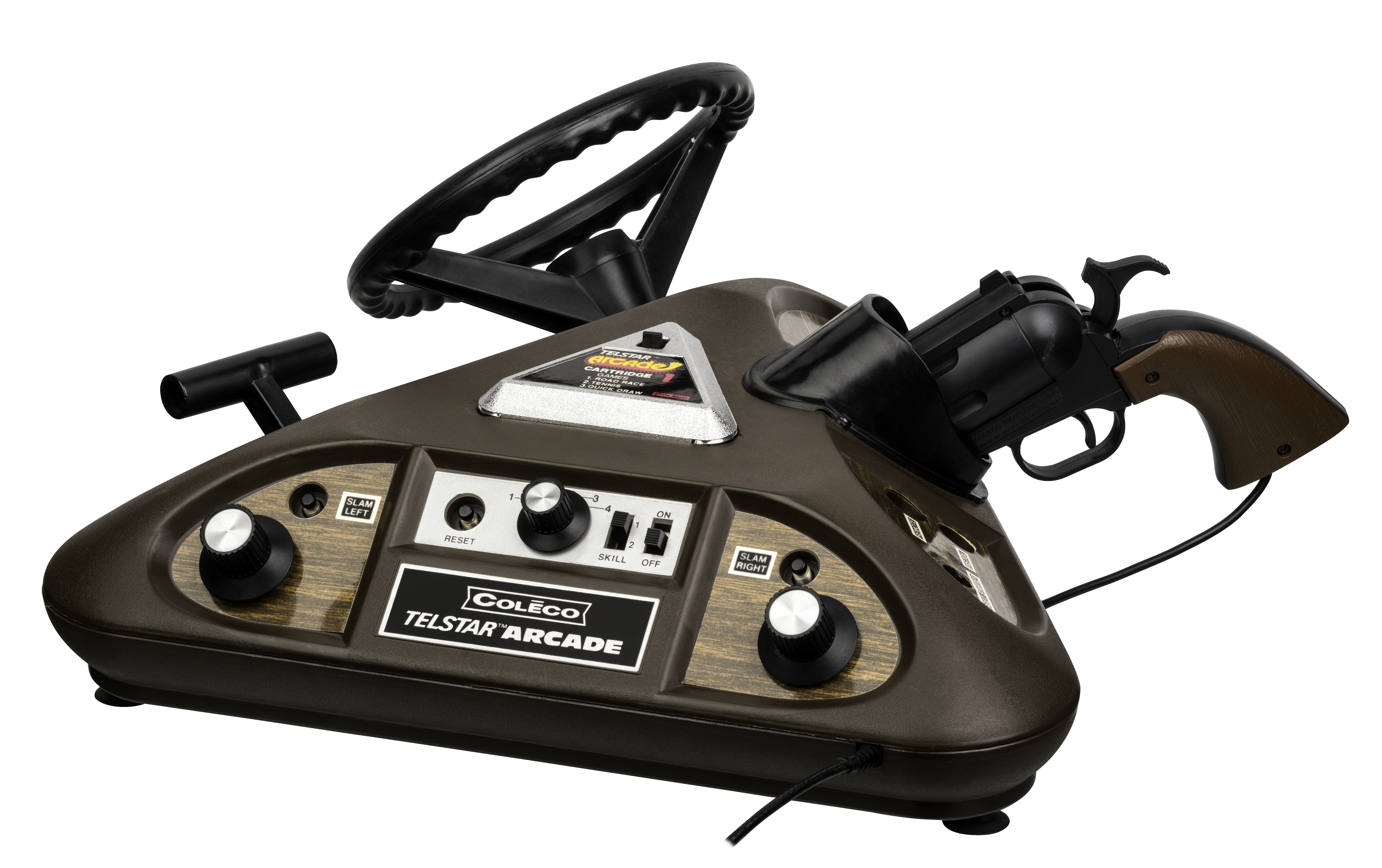
- A Coleco Telstar Arcade with cartridge inserted
- Also known as: Telstar Arcade
- Manufacturer: Coleco
- Type: Home video game console
- Generation: First generation
- Released: August 1977
- CPU: MOS Technology MPS-7600-00x (one for each cartridge)
- Dimensions: 7.5 × 18 × 16 in.
- Weight: 4 lb

The Coleco Telstar Arcade, commonly abbreviated as Telstar Arcade, is a first-generation home video game console that was released in 1977 in Japan, North America and Europe by Coleco. It is the most advanced video game console in the Coleco Telstar series, based on the MOS Technology MPS-7600-00x chips series. Each chip is a microcontroller capable of storing 512 words of ROM.

It was first unveiled at the New York Toy Fair in February 1977, for a planned launch in June. It was first reported in stores in August selling for $100, It was the third microprocessor based console to release, following the Fairchild Channel F and RCA Studio II and just proceeding the Atari 2600.

== Construction and concept ==
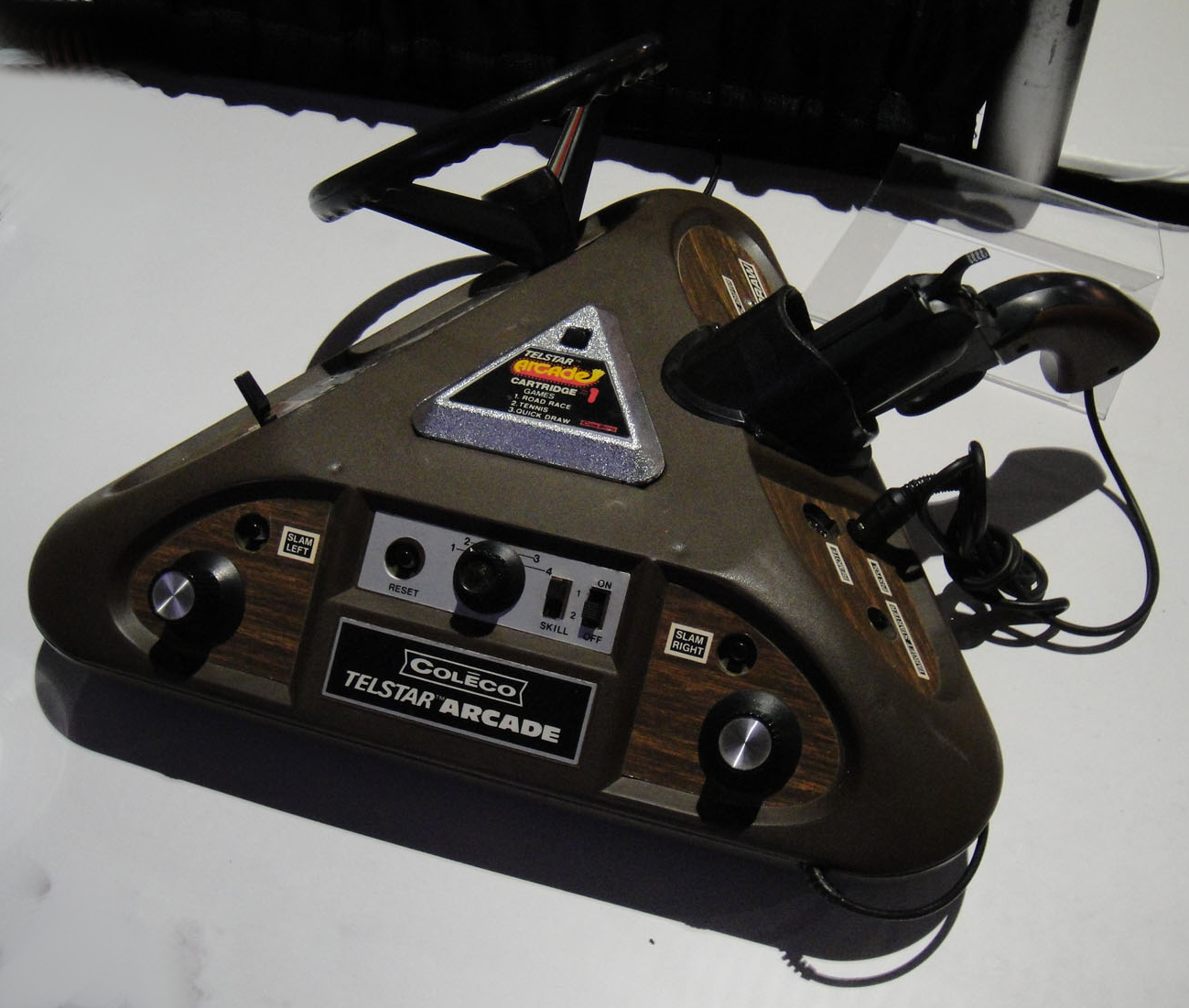
Image revealing the three sides of the system

The Coleco Telstar Arcade is formed like a triangle. On every side are other game-specific controls. There is a side with a steering wheel and a lever, a side with a lightgun, and a side with two paddles. Depending on the game played, the player may use another side.

== Games ==
The games came on silver-colored cartridges, each containing a MOS Technology MPS-7600-00X chip. There were a total of 4 cartridges released for the system by Coleco. Every cartridge has a triangular shape which connects on the top of the console.

All games:

- Cartridge 1 (chip MPS 7600–002): Road Race (1 player), Tennis (Pong clone; 2-4 players) and Quickdraw (1-2 players)
- Cartridge 2 (chip MPS 7600–001): Hockey (2-4 players), Tennis (2-4 players), Handball (1-2 players) and Target (1 player)
- Cartridge 3 (chip MPS 7600–004): Bonus Pinball (1-2 players), Shooting Gallery (1 player), Shoot the Bear (1 player) and Deluxe Pinball (1-2 players)
- Cartridge 4 (chip MPS 7600–003): Naval Battle (1 player), Blast Away (1 player) and Speedball (1 player)
