= Sinden =

Sinden may refer to:

- Sinden (surname)
- Sinden Light Gun, a video game controller
- 10369 Sinden, a main-belt asteroid
- The Count & Sinden, a British music duo
- Pesindhèn, Javanese female solo singer

== See also ==
- Sindon (disambiguation)
- Shinden (disambiguation)
