= Dream Life =

Hasbro role playing game aimed at girls ages 8-14

Dream Life is a dedicated console life simulation game targeted at girls between the ages of 8 and 14 created by Hasbro and released in 2005. Dream Life is a game where players create a girl character, ranging from hair to clothes. They can also determine how smart, funny, athletic, creative or outgoing the girl character is.

== Premise ==
In the game, players may buy clothes, make their best friend (which also has to be a girl) exactly the same way they made their character. They can sign up for various activities and win trophies. They have to go to school and if the character gets good grades, she can get things for her room like a TV or phone. She can get a makeover (which is a choice of hair style, hair color and makeup), develop a crush (and maybe dance with him at a party). She can interact with other people created by the makers of the game at the stations where you can do everything. She can also earn money by doing chores in your house, particularly the kitchen. Another way to earn money is to get a job, located at their school.

There's a counter set in the bottom left corner of the TV screen. The characters always wake up at 7:00 and can use the various activities until the moon rises up to the top middle of the counter (about 10:00). But if there's time left to do one more activity, it doesn't have to be that short, as the moon can go out as far as needed, but only once. The Game starts out in the fall.

The more friends acquired, the more points earned. This also applies to the character's sense of fashion, and lifestyle. At the end of three seasons (fall, winter, spring) there's a summary of what the character has done in her life. After that, the players can start over and make a new person.

== Dream Life Superstar ==
In this game, the player will be spending a virtual summer in a world of virtual people, places, things, and activities. Built into the game is a calendar to keep track of the player's time and activities in the game.

The object of the game is to become a superstar: the player may become an Actress, Singer, Writer, TV Star, Fashion Designer, or Athlete. By doing things and making friends, the player earns their way to superstardom; the bigger the celebrity, the more perks you get. The player has to spend time and money wisely, and they'll earn privileges: to buy things, meet people, and go places.

== See also ==
- Designer's World: a follow-up game
