= Shinden =

Shinden may refer to:

- Kyushu J7W Shinden, an interceptor airplane
- Shinden (寝殿), the main building of a shinden-zukuri, a Heian period mansion in Japan
- Shinden (神殿), or honden, the most sacred part of a Shinto shrine
- Shinden Station (disambiguation), several train stations

== See also ==
- Sinden (disambiguation)
