= Game crash =

Game crash may refer to:

- video game crash of 1977, a glut in the market caused by manufacturers clearing older stock.
- video game crash of 1983
- Crash (computing)
