= Direct-to-TV =

Direct-to-TV may refer to:

- Dedicated console, a video game console with built-in games
- Television film, a feature-length film produced for release on a television network
