= Killer Shark (arcade game) =

1972 light-gun electro-mechanical game

- Publisher: Sega
- Release: 1972
- Genre: Light-gun shooter

Killer Shark is a 1972 light-gun shooter electro-mechanical game released by Sega. The player uses a light gun to shoot at a shark as it approaches the player. Killer Shark was popularized after it appeared in the film Jaws.

== Design and gameplay ==
Killer Shark is a light-gun shooter. The game area depicts the sea as a shark moves around, and the player holds a light gun that resembles a harpoon. The shark moves toward the player, who must shoot it with the light gun. The shark is created by projecting illustrations from a rotating disc at a mirror, which then reflects the image onto a frosted screen. Each successful shot causes the shark to thrash. Killer Shark uses an 8-track cartridge to play sound, and the machine is decorated with image of a shark and a scuba diver.

== Development and release ==
Killer Shark was created by Sega and released in 1972. It is reportedly the first arcade game about a shark.

Killer Shark briefly appeared in the film Jaws. A man is shown playing the game in a scene where people walk by the arcade toward the beach, falsely believing the film's man-eating shark has been killed. Gameplay is shown for a few seconds. It became more popular after its appearance in Jaws.
