= Stack Light Rifle =

Light gun

The Stack Light Rifle is a light gun that was manufactured by Stack Computer Services for use with the ZX Spectrum, Commodore 64, and VIC-20. It was released in 1983. The rifle is bundled with three games on tape: High Noon, Shooting Gallery, and Grouse Shoot for the Spectrum. Different games were offered for the Commodore 64 and VIC-20 versions (all the games for these two systems were included on one cassette).The Stack Light Rifle is differentiated from future light guns as being realistic looking.

The main pistol is attached to 12 feet of cable which ends in a dead-ended ZX81-size connector which plugs into the Spectrum's user port. A barrel, stock and telescopic sight can all be attached to the pistol. The barrel actually facilitated the gun's performance as it filtered out ambient light. These three parts combined to provide a reasonable – if not perfect – degree of accuracy, and allowed the user to effectively use the light gun from the comfort of an armchair.

Variants of the Light Rifle were available for the ZX Spectrum, VIC-20, and Commodore 64 and all perform the same function. Like the Atari XG-1 light gun, the Stack Light Rifle is treated by the hardware as a light pen. Due to lack of availability of software drivers for the Light Rifle, only the three games that came with the device were available. In April 1985, Sinclair User magazine reported that the Stack Computer Services company had disappeared.

== Technical specifications ==
The main component of the Stack Light Rifle System is the electronic target pistol that is connected to the computer by a generous length of lead. At the computer end, depending on the version, there is a connector for the appropriate socket or edge connector. On the ZX Spectrum version the connector contains two chips and a couple of simple components to interface the main electronics inside the gun to the computer. To make the pistol more accurate and to turn it into a rifle – it is supplied with a shoulder stock that clips and secures to the rear of the pistol, a barrel and a make-believe telescopic sight.

The electronics inside the pistol consist of a light detector or photo-diode and a small amplifier and buffer. Light coming down the barrel is focused by a small plastic lens onto the photo-diode, and the device is sensitive enough to detect the changes in intensity of the picture. Once boosted by the amplifier, the signal is clipped to provide a digital pulse rather than an analogue waveform and is then fed to the computer via the switch. The screen position that is being scanned at that moment is the position the rifle is pointing at. As the computer receives the pulse from the Light Rifle it compares the value of its scan registers with the screen position of the target and, if a match is found, the played has scored a direct hit.

== Supported Games ==
=== Commodore 64 ===
- Escape From Alcatraz
- High Noon
- Glorious 12th
- Gallery
- Crowshoot
- Rats & Cats
- Indian Attack
- Starbase Defender
- Cosmic Commando

=== VIC-20 ===
- High Noon
- Shooting Gallery
- Glorious 12th/Grouse shoot

=== ZX Spectrum ===
- High Noon
- Shooting Gallery
- Grouse Shoot/Glorious 12th
- Invasion Force
