= Sindon =

Sindon may refer to:

- Sindon (cloth), a type of fine muslin fabric; by extension also an item of this fabric:
  - burial shroud, especially the one used for the burial of Jesus (see Shroud of Turin)
  - corporals, cloths used in Christian liturgy
  - wads or rolls of such cloth formerly used in filling open wounds during surgery
- Šinđon, a village in Cetinje Municipality, Montenegro
- Sindon (horse), a horse who won the Irish Derby in the 1950s
- Sindon, Myanmar, a place in Shwebo Township

== See also ==
- Sinden (disambiguation)
