= Sinden Light Gun =

Video game controller

- Developer: Sinden Technology Ltd.
- Manufacturer: Sinden Technology Ltd.
- Type: Light gun
- Released: September 2020
- Introductory price: £90; US$112; €101
- Power: USB port
- Platform: Windows, Linux

The Sinden Light Gun is a light gun released by Sinden Technology in 2020 for the PC. It is compatible with LCD monitors and TVs without additional hardware (e.g. a Sensor Bar).

== History ==
The gun was funded on Indiegogo and Kickstarter in 2019.

MiSTer FPGA added support for the gun in 2024.

== Design ==
The gun tracks a white border generated around the edges of the screen. There are optional upgrades to the gun like a recoil system, an arcade pedal (for use with Time Crisis games), and a holster.

== Reception ==
VG247 called it "an incredible piece of technology". Ars Technica noted: "[...] the gun works, and it rocks. Just don't go into this PC-exclusive hardware experiment expecting plug-and-play simplicity." Time Extension said: "The Sinden light gun works like a charm, is surprisingly accurate and [...] is capable of getting astonishingly close to the original arcade experience." GamesRadar+ gave a positive review and praised the build quality and the design but didn't like the lack of screen space due to a white border around the screen, and criticized the overwhelming setup software.
