= Sinden (surname) =

Sinden is a surname. Notable people with the surname include:

- Bradly Sinden (born 1998), British taekwondo athlete
- Donald Sinden (1923–2014) English stage, television and film actor
- Harry Sinden (born 1932) former Boston Bruins NHL coach and general manager
- Jeremy Sinden (1950–1996) English actor, son of Donald
- Marc Sinden (born 1954) English film director, actor and theatre producer, son of Donald
- Topsy Sinden (1878–1950) English dancer, actress and singer
