= Shinden Station =

Shinden Station (新田駅) is the name of two train stations in Japan:

- Shinden Station (Kyoto)
- Shinden Station (Saitama)
