= Magnavox Odyssey =

First commercial home video game console

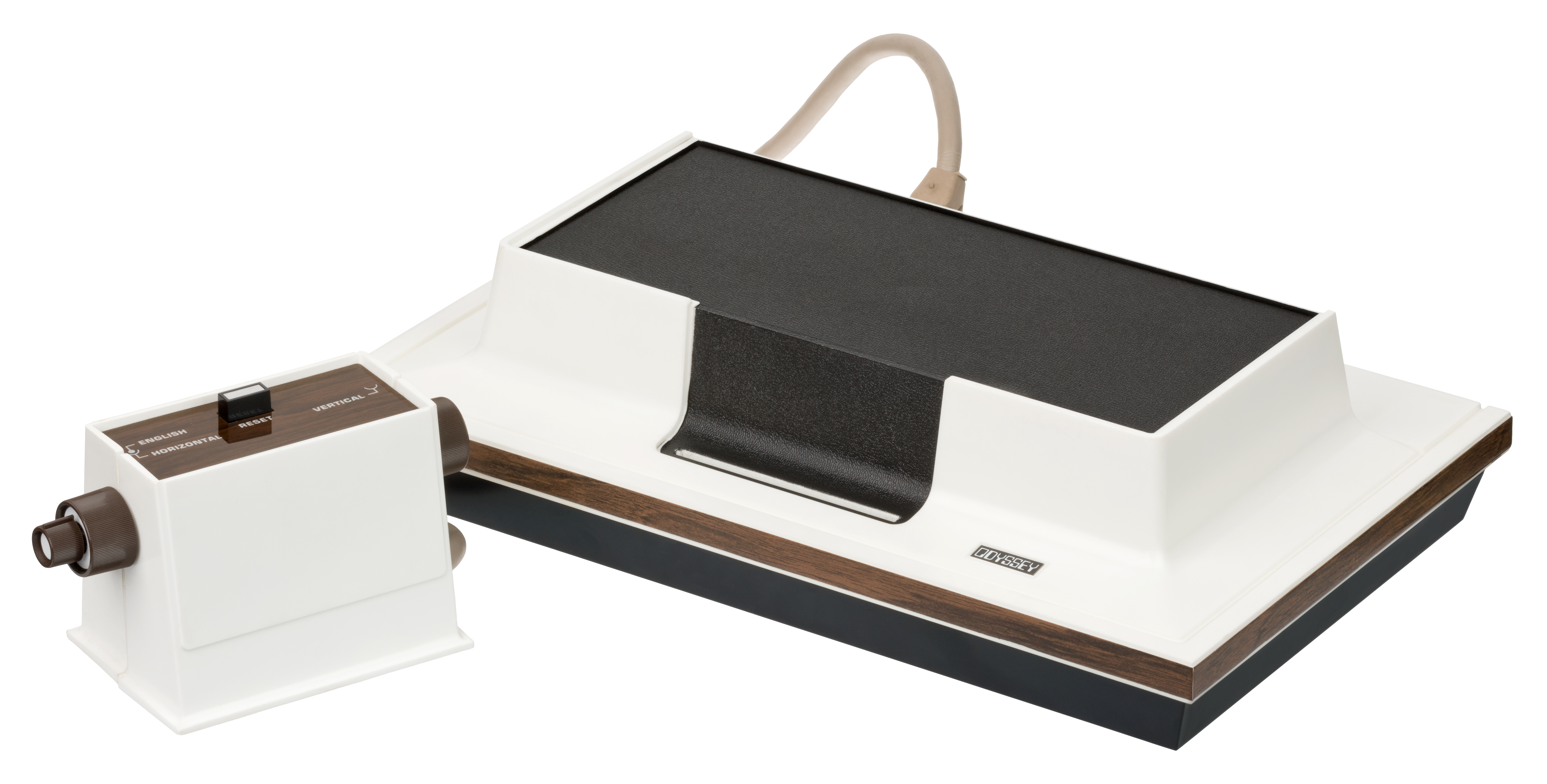
- A Magnavox Odyssey with a controller
- Developer: Sanders Associates
- Manufacturer: Magnavox
- Product family: Odyssey series
- Type: Home video game console
- Generation: First
- Released: NA: September 1972; UK: 1973; EU: 1974
- Introductory price: US$99.95 (equivalent to about $770 in 2025)
- Discontinued: 1975
- Units sold: 350,000
- Controller input: Two paddles, light gun
- Successor: Magnavox Odyssey 100/Magnavox Odyssey 2

The Magnavox Odyssey is the first commercial home video game console. The hardware was designed by a small team led by Ralph H. Baer at Sanders Associates, while Magnavox completed development and released it in the United States in September 1972, in the United Kingdom in 1973, and in other European countries in 1974. The Odyssey consists of a black, white, and brown oblong box that connects to a television set, and two rectangular controllers attached by wires. It is capable of displaying three square dots and one line of varying height on the screen in monochrome black and white, with differing behavior for the dots depending on the game played. Players place plastic overlays on the screen to display additional visual elements for each game, and one or two players for each game control their dots with the knobs and buttons on the controller by the rules given for the game. The console cannot generate audio or track scores. The Odyssey came packaged with dice, paper money, and other board game paraphernalia to accompany the games, while a light gun peripheral was sold separately.

The idea for a video game console was conceived by Baer in August 1966. Over the next three years he, along with Bill Harrison and Bill Rusch, created seven successive prototype consoles. The seventh, known as the Brown Box, was shown to several manufacturers before Magnavox agreed to produce it in January 1971. After releasing the console through their dealerships, Magnavox sold 69,000 units in its first calendar year and 350,000 by the time the console was discontinued in 1975.

The console spawned the Odyssey series of dedicated consoles as well as the 1978 Magnavox Odyssey 2. One of the system's 28 games, a ping-pong, was an inspiration for Atari's successful 1972 Pong arcade game, in turn driving sales of the Odyssey. Patents by Baer and the other developers for the system and the games, including what was termed by a judge as "the pioneering patent of the video game art", formed the basis of a series of lawsuits spanning 20 years, earning Sanders and Magnavox over US$100 million. The release of the Odyssey marked the beginning of the first generation of video game consoles and was an early part of the rise of the commercial video game industry.

== Design ==
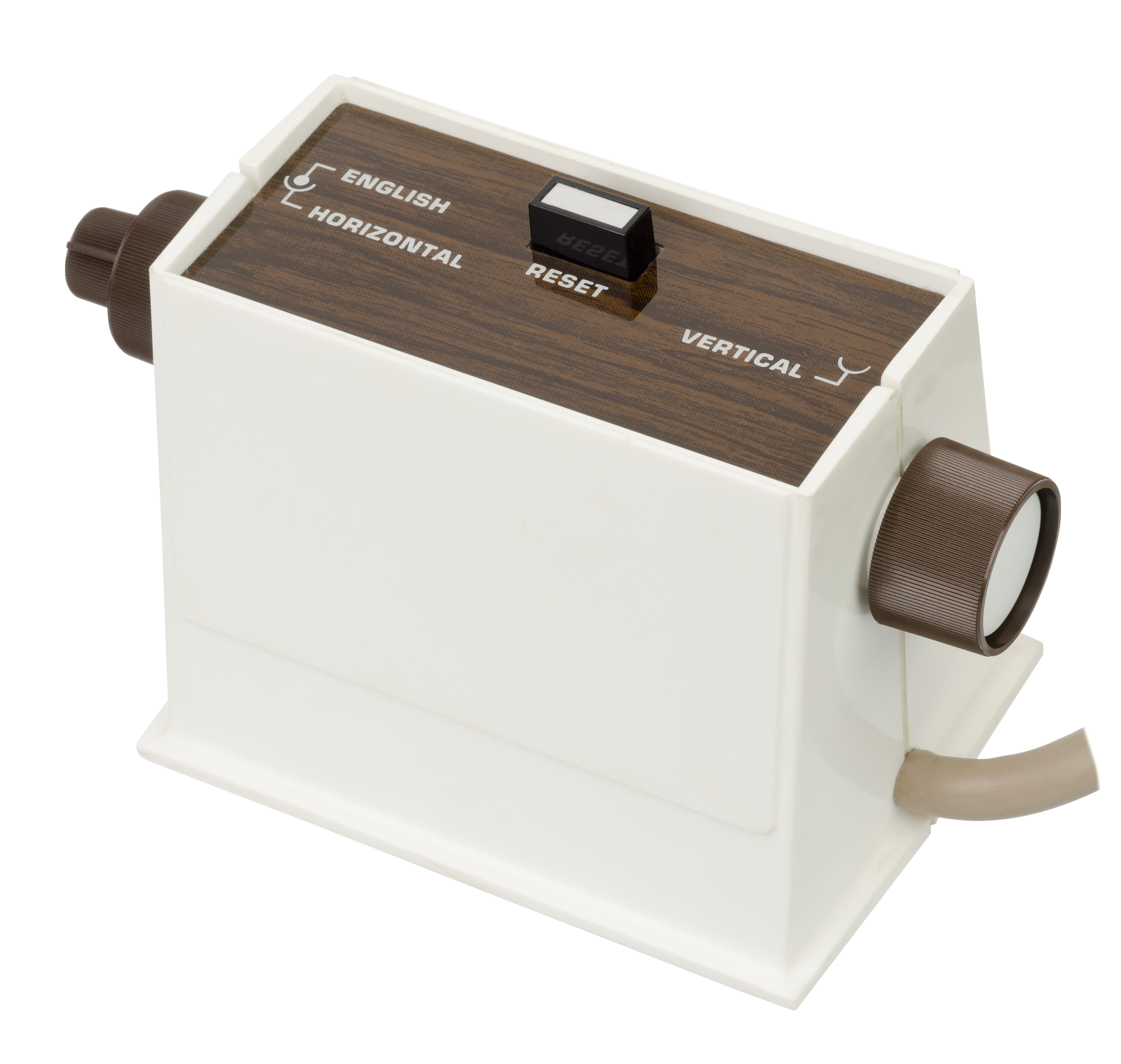
An Odyssey controller

The Odyssey consists of a black, white, and brown oblong box connected by wires to two rectangular controllers. The console connects to the television set through an included switch box, which allows the player to switch the television input between the Odyssey and the regular television input cable, and presents itself like a television channel on channel three or four, which thereafter became the standard for game consoles. The controllers, designed to sit on a flat surface, contain one button marked Reset on the top of the controller and three knobs: one on the right side of the controller, and two on the left with one extending from the other. The reset button resets individual elements depending on the game, such as making a player's dot visible after it is turned off. The system can be powered by six C batteries, which were included; an optional AC adapter was sold separately. The Odyssey lacks sound capability and can only display monochrome white shapes on a blank black screen.

Internally, the Odyssey architecture is composed of digital computing parts. The circuitry is implemented in diode–transistor logic using discrete transistors and diodes. The games themselves do not use ROM cartridges like later consoles, but instead, use "game cards" composed of printed circuit boards that plug into the console. These cards modify the internal circuitry like a set of switches or jumpers, causing the Odyssey to display different components and react to inputs differently. Multiple games use the same cards, with different instructions given to the player to change the style of the game.

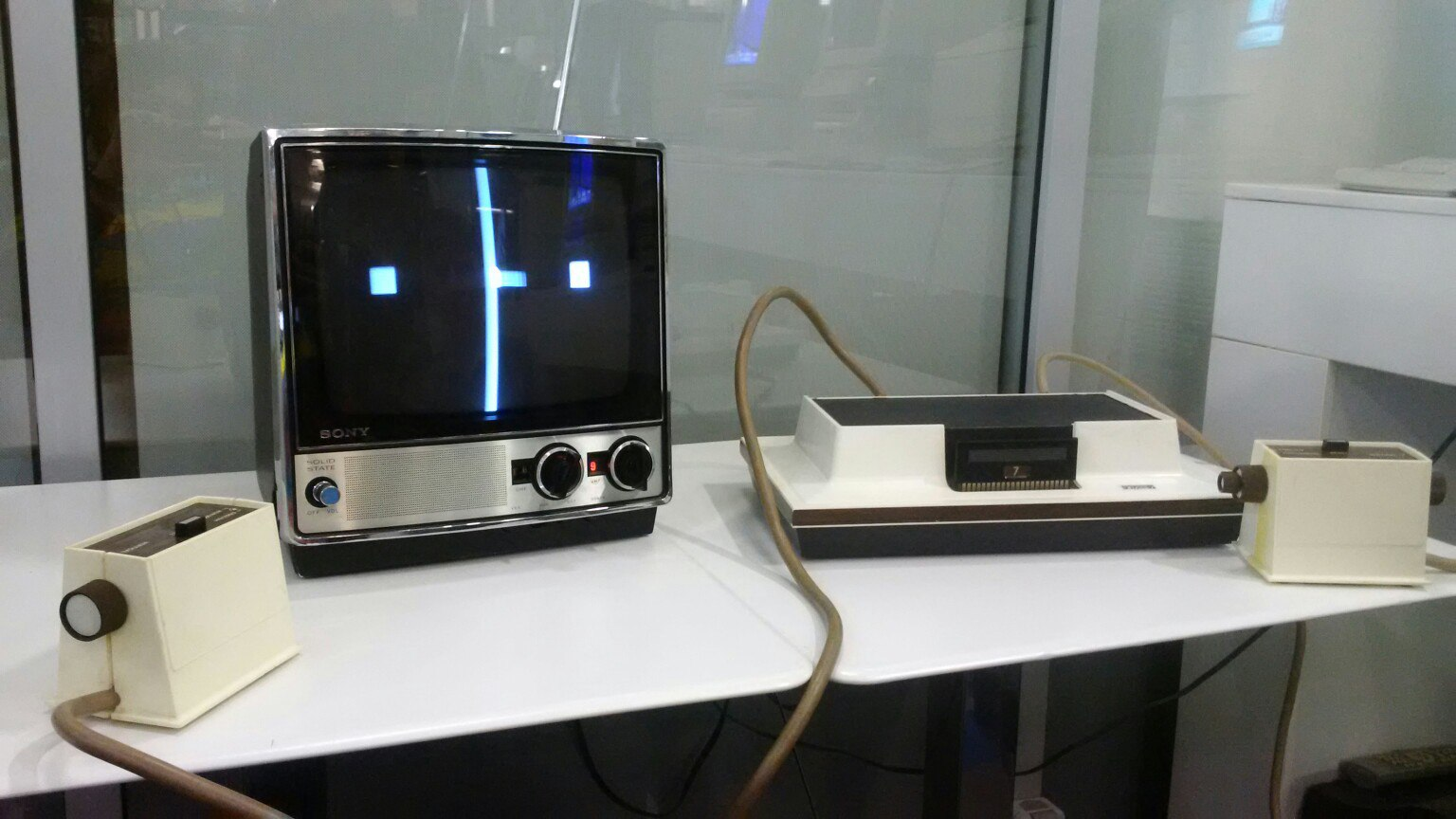
Table tennis game for the Odyssey with the console on a CRT television, without any overlay

The Odyssey is capable of displaying three square dots and a vertical line on the screen. Two of the dots are controlled by the two players, and the third by the system itself. The main console has two dials, one of which moves the vertical line across the screen, and one which adjusts the speed of the computer-controlled dot. Different games direct the player to adjust the dials to different positions, such as changing the center line of a tennis game into the side wall of a handball game. The games include plastic overlays that stick to the television via static cling to create visuals. Games that use the same game card can have different overlays, which can change a game with the same controls from, for example, a mountain ski path to a movement-based Simon Says game.

In addition to the overlays, the Odyssey came with dice, poker chips, score sheets, play money, and card decks. One peripheral controller was released for the Odyssey, the first video game light gun. Named the Electronic Rifle, the rifle-shaped device registered a hit when pointed at a light source such as a dot on the television screen. Four shooting-based games were included with the light gun. The light guns were designed and manufactured by Nintendo, based on their 1970 Beam Gun toy.

== Development ==
In 1951, while working for military contractor Loral Electronics, engineer Ralph H. Baer was assigned to build a television set; Baer later claimed that, while doing so, he had the idea to build something into a television set that the owner could control in addition to its normal function of receiving signals from a remote television station. Loral did not pursue the idea, but it returned to Baer in August 1966 while waiting for a bus. Baer, then the head of the Equipment Design Division at military contractor Sanders Associates, came up with the concept of using a television to play games, and the next morning wrote up a four-page proposal for a "game box" that would plug into a television screen, costing around US$25 (equivalent to about $250 in 2025). The proposed device would transmit a signal that the television set could tune into like a television channel, which Baer referred to as Channel LP, short for "let's play", and he described several games that could be played on it. While electronic computer games had been developed since the start of the 1950s, they were typically only found in large academic or research institutions, and in 1966 no commercial games or video game industry existed, or any form of video games for consumer television sets.

As a "game box" had little to do with the typical military contracts Sanders worked on, Baer picked an empty room and assigned one of his technicians, Bob Tremblay, to work on it with him rather than bring the idea to his bosses. By December 1966, they had completed an initial prototype later christened "TV Game #1", which could display and move a vertical line on a television screen. Baer demonstrated the prototype to the Sanders director of research and development, Herbert Campman, who hesitantly agreed to fund it for US$2,000 (equivalent to about $19,850 in 2025) for labor and US$500 (equivalent to about $4,960 in 2025) for materials, making it an official project.

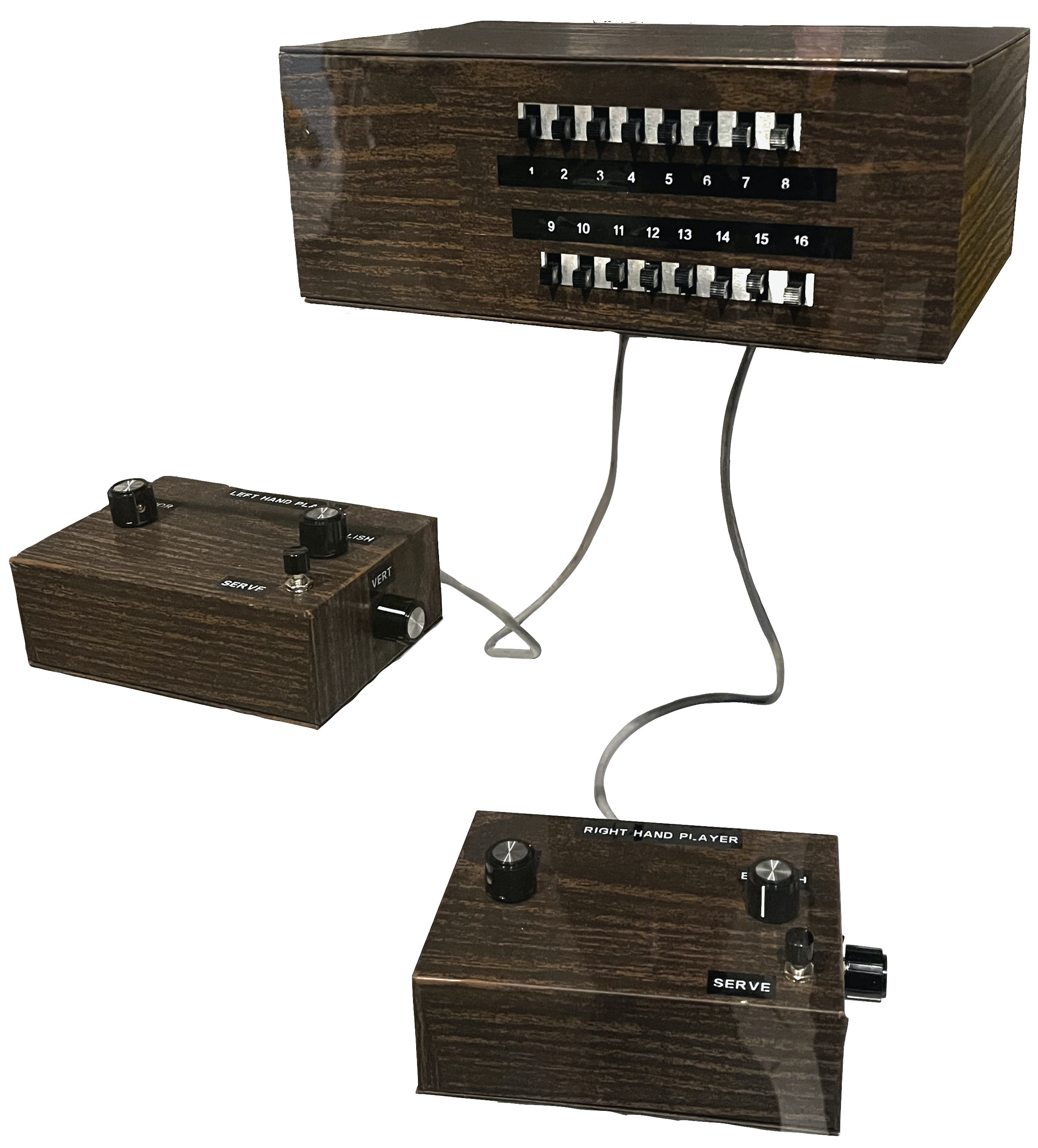
"Brown Box" replica constructed by Baer on display at the National Videogame Museum

Baer spent the next few months designing further prototypes, and in February 1967, assigned technician Bill Harrison to begin building the project. Harrison spent the next few months in between other projects building out successive modifications to the prototype. Baer, meanwhile, brainstormed with engineer Bill Rusch on ideas for games for the console, resulting in a proposal for the basis of many games later created for the system. Harrison began developing some early games in May, beginning with a two-player game where the players repeatedly press a button in competition to fill or empty a bucket of water, and by June multiple games were completed for what was then a second prototype box. These included a game where players controlled dots chasing each other and a light gun shooter game with a plastic rifle. Baer demonstrated the new prototype to Campman, who enjoyed the shooting game, increased funding, and recommended Baer demonstrate the project to senior management. Baer demonstrated the console to the board, who were largely uninterested, though a couple of members were enthusiastic; nevertheless, CEO Royden Sanders authorized the project to be continued with the aim of selling or licensing the console as a commercial product.

By August 1967, Baer and Harrison completed a more focused prototype machine with fewer components, but found that to even come near to Baer's initial price target of US$25 the console would require so much to be excluded that the resulting product would not be very enjoyable. Baer additionally felt that he was not proving successful at designing fun games for the system; to make up for this he formally added Bill Rusch, who had helped him come up with the initial games for the console, to the project. Though the pair found Rusch difficult to work with, he soon proved his value to the team by coming up with a way to display a third, console-controlled spot on the screen in addition to the previous two player-controlled ones, and proposing the development of a ping-pong game. By November, the team, now on their fourth prototype machine, had a ping-pong game, a chasing game, a light gun game, and three types of controllers: joysticks for the chase game, a rifle for the light gun game, and a three dial controller for the ping-pong game. Campman felt that the system was advanced enough to begin trying to find a manufacturer to buy it; they had decided to sell the rights to produce the console, as Sanders was not in the business of making and selling commercial electronics.

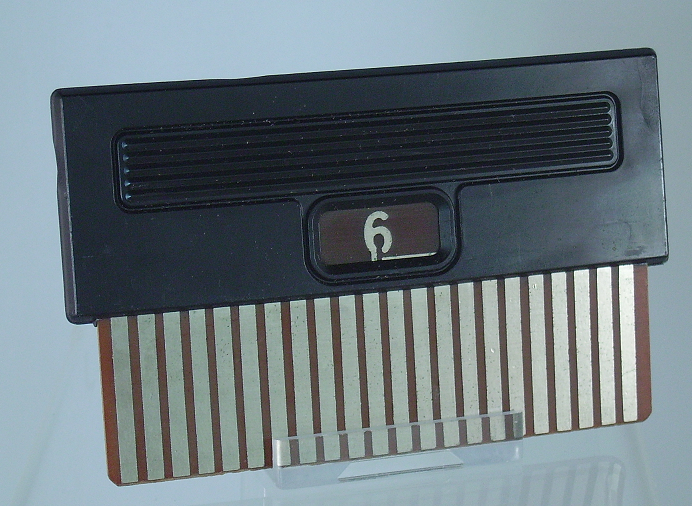
Magnavox Odyssey Cartridge No. 6

The team first approached the cable television industry, and the prototype attracted the attention of TelePrompTer Corporation, who had seen it during a visit. After a few months of talks, cash-flow problems forced TelePrompTer to back out in April 1968. The same economic downturn that caused TelePrompTer's problems caused financial difficulties at Sanders as well, which put the project on hold after the fifth prototype was developed while simultaneously undergoing large-scale layoffs. It was picked up again in September, this time without Rusch, and went through two more iterations resulting in January 1969 in the seventh prototype, known as the "Brown Box" due to the wood-grain stickers on the casing. With the system now largely complete, as the team began filing for patents they were unsure whom to approach to sell it until a Sanders patent attorney recommended contacting television manufacturers. Baer demonstrated the system to several companies, who all expressed enthusiasm; only RCA wanted to purchase the device, however, and an agreement could not be reached. Soon afterwards, though, RCA executive Bill Enders left RCA for Magnavox and convinced them to look at the console again. The creators of the Brown Box again demonstrated the device to Magnavox in July 1969; they received a tepid reaction from most of the executives, but Vice President of Magnavox Console Products Planning Gerry Martin was in favor, and Magnavox agreed to produce the console. After a long period of negotiations the two companies finally signed an agreement in January 1971.

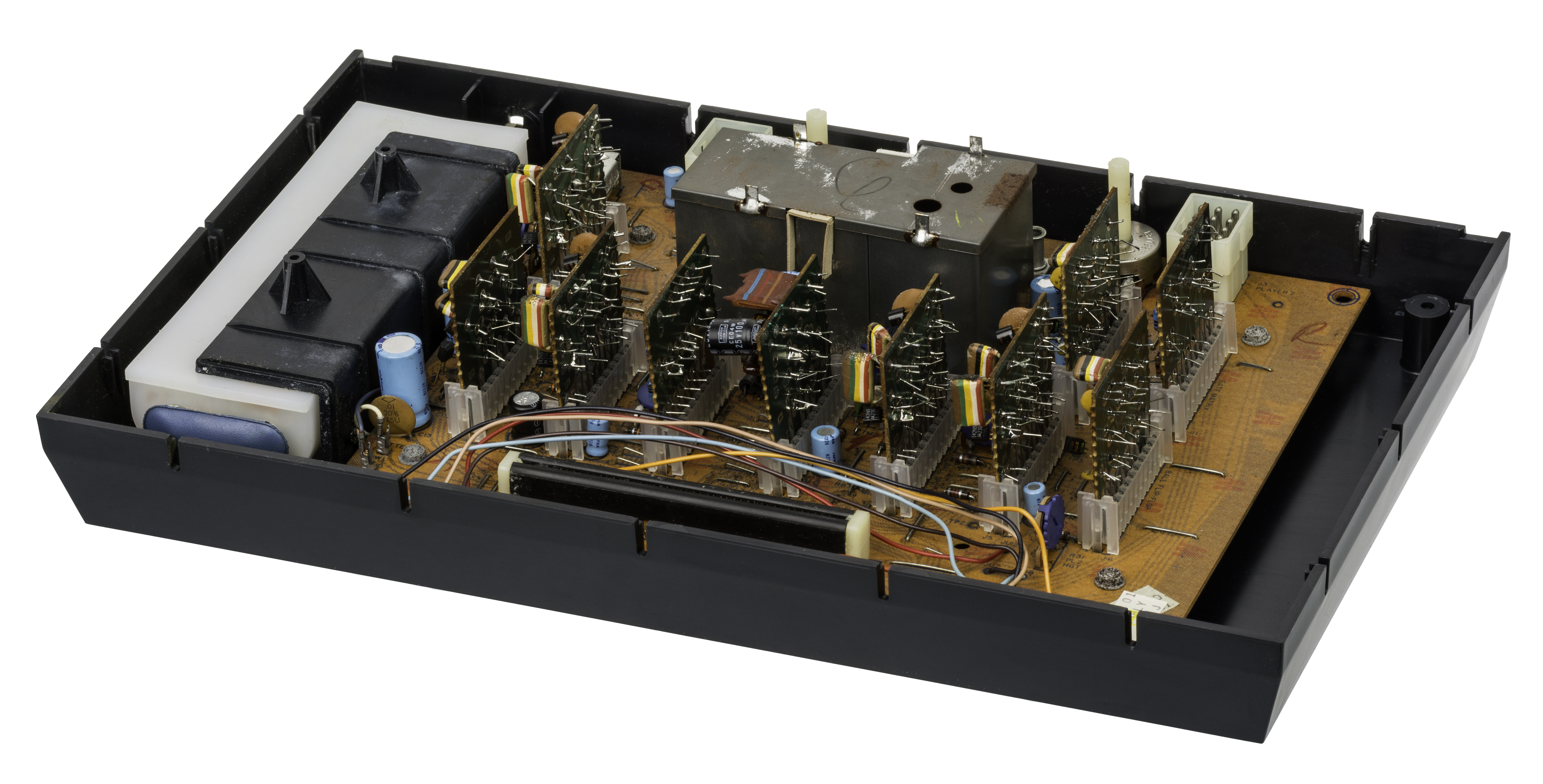
The inside of the Magnavox Odyssey showing its motherboard and battery compartment

A team from Magnavox led by George Kent turned the prototype console into a final product. They designed the exterior of the machine and re-engineered some of the internals with consultation from Baer and Harrison; they removed the ability to display color, used only the three dial controller, and changed the system of selecting games from a dial to separate game cards that modified the console's circuitry when plugged into the console. At the time, color televisions were still seen as a luxury item, and the ability to show color would have added additional expense and time spent dealing with FCC testing and regulations. The internal circuitry had been designed with discrete components rather than integrated circuits due to cost concerns, and although integrated circuits were becoming common by 1972 Magnavox did not redesign the circuitry to use them. The games for the system were designed by Ron Bradford of Bradford/Cout Design and adman Steve Lehner, based largely on the ones developed by Baer, Harrison, and Rusch. The product planning for the console was initially overseen by Bob Wiles of the color television division, but was turned over to product manager Bob Fritsche as its own category of product in September 1971.

Magnavox named the console first as the Skill-O-Vision while testing, and then released it as the Odyssey. The rifle game was turned into a separately sold add-on game, Shooting Gallery, and Magnavox added paper money, playing cards, and poker chips to the console, to go along with the plastic overlays for the games designed by Bradford that enhanced the primitive visuals. The new additions helped raise the price of the console to US$99.95 (equivalent to about $770 in 2025). Baer was upset with the board game additions, which he felt were pointless add-ons that would go unused by players. Magnavox performed market surveys and playtests in Los Angeles and Grand Rapids, Michigan, and demonstrated it to dealers in Las Vegas in May 1972. The console was publicly unveiled at a press event at the Tavern on the Green in New York City on May 22, 1972. Magnavox announced the system's launch date of September 1972, with availability restricted to dealers in 18 metropolitan areas, and demonstrated it for the next few months to Magnavox dealerships and media.

== Reception ==
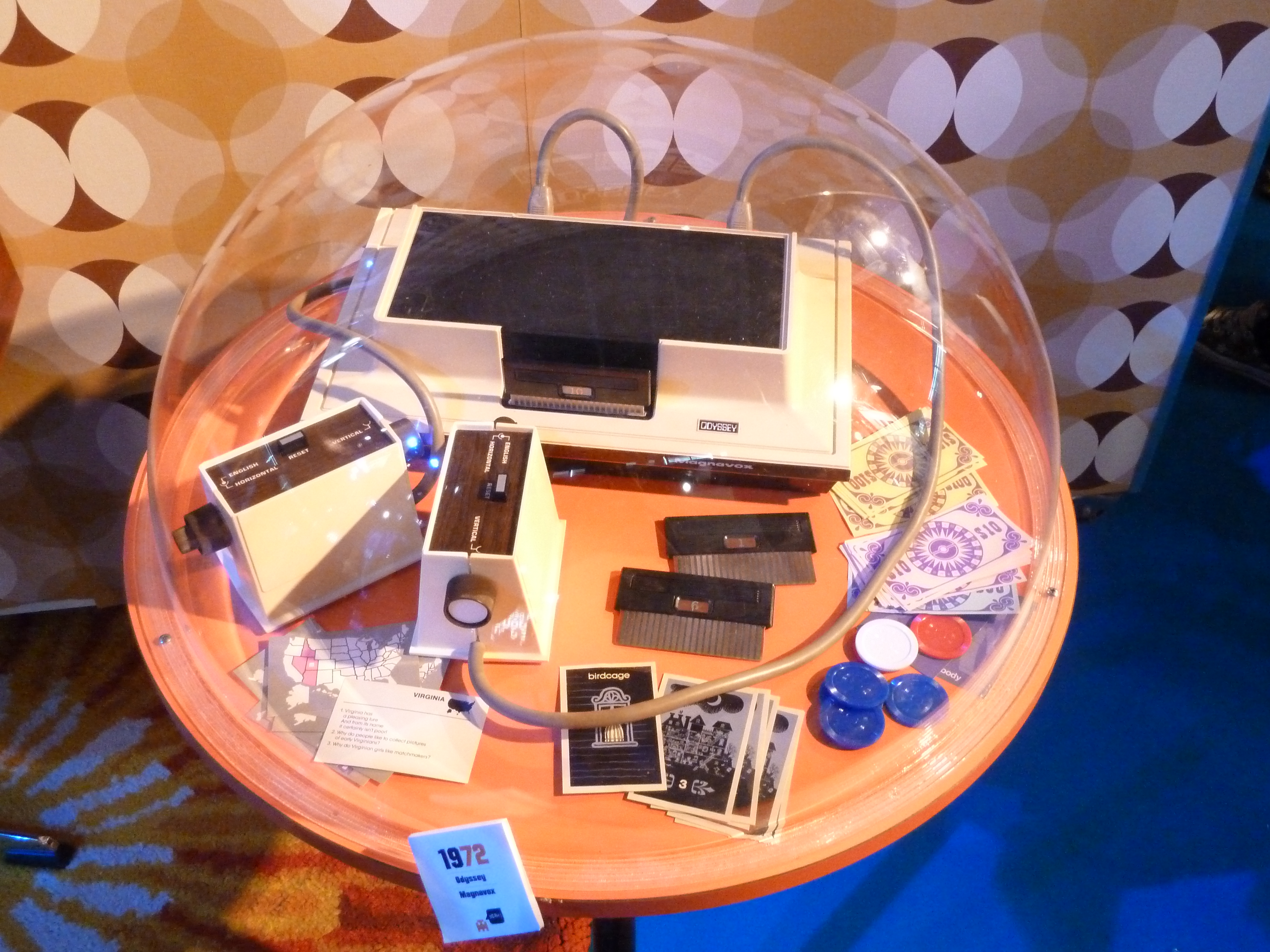
The Magnavox Odyssey at the 2010 Festival du Jeu Vidéo

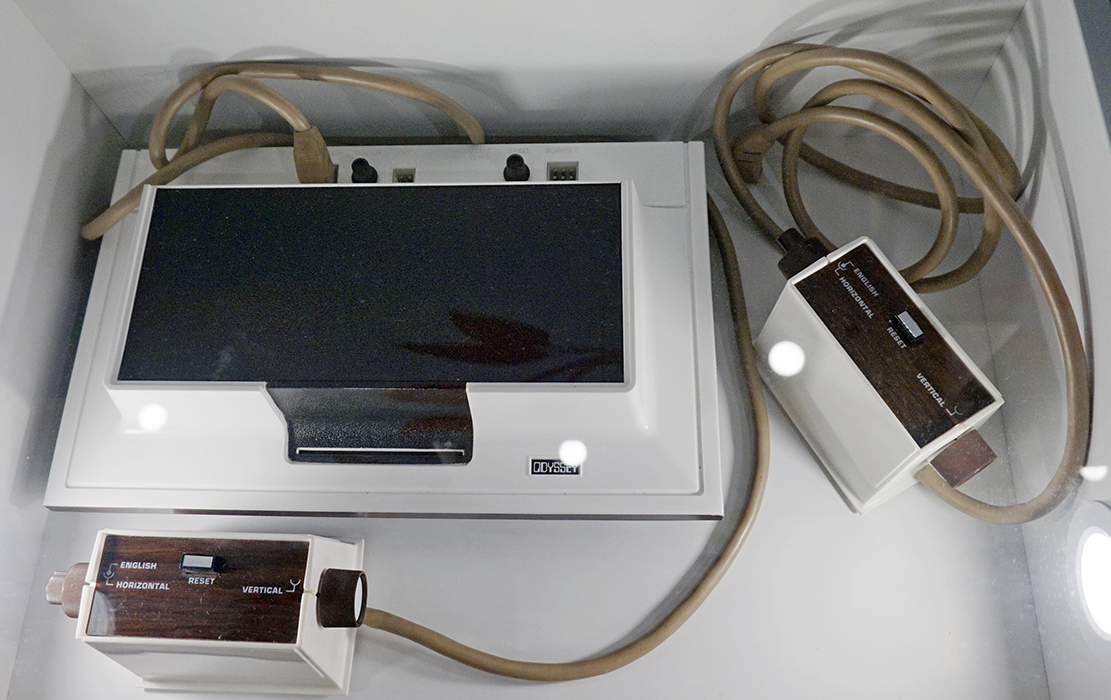
The Magnavox Odyssey at the Finnish Museum of Games in Tampere, Finland in 2017

Magnavox began advertising the Odyssey in mid-September 1972, including an appearance on the game show What's My Line? on October 16, 1972. As the term "video game" was not yet in use, the company described the console as "the new electronic game of the future" and "closed-circuit electronic playground". Magnavox initially ordered 50,000 units, but before release increased its production capabilities and built a larger inventory, as market testing found an enthusiastic response to the console. The Odyssey was sold only through Magnavox dealers, who handled their own advertising in their local markets; the company hoped that as the video game console was the first such product, consumers would visit its stores specifically for it.

There are conflicting reports between Baer and Magnavox employees as to whether Magnavox produced 120,000 or 140,000 consoles in 1972. Magnavox only sold 69,000 units. Baer believed that the low initial sales were due to the high price, and because Magnavox restricted sales to its dealerships and implied that the device only worked with Magnavox televisions. Other sources have stated that dealers may have misled customers to sell more televisions, though advertisements and in-store promotional videos explicitly stated that the Odyssey worked with "any brand TV, black and white or color". Customers unfamiliar with the new device, seeing it was only sold at Magnavox dealerships, may have misunderstood its interoperability.

Magnavox assistant product planner Don Emry said that the sales were in line with the original projections, if not the production run. After the initial holiday season Magnavox considered discontinuing the console, but the modest continuing demand, along with high customer satisfaction reports in surveys, convinced it to continue stocking the console. Magnavox published two catalogs each year, one before the Christmas season and another for its annual sale in January. The Odyssey did not appear in the pre-Christmas 1972 catalog, but the January 1973 catalog depicted the console in a two-page spread with pictures of bundled and optional games and the light gun. Fritsche's team proposed the creation of alternate versions of the Odyssey, a "lite" version with five games and a version with four controllers and a dozen new or updated games. Baer proposed an add-on that would add sound to games, and a putting controller and associated golf game. Magnavox rejected the proposals, instead releasing four games for sale in 1973, designed wholly or in part by Emry.

Although still only available at Magnavox dealers, national marketing for Odyssey began in late 1973. The company lowered the price to US$50 (equivalent to about $360 in 2025) if purchased with a television. The console was released that year with different games in the United Kingdom. In late 1973, Magnavox ran a large advertising campaign for its 1974 products, including sponsoring Frank Sinatra's November television special Ol' Blue Eyes Is Back. Commercials during the special and advertisements for it showed the Odyssey and other Magnavox products. Continuing demand led Magnavox to manufacture an additional 27,000 units for the 1973 holiday season, selling 20,000 of them according to Baer. It was released in 1974 in limited quantities in several other countries: Australia, Belgium, France, Germany, Greece, Israel, Italy, the Soviet Union, Switzerland, and Venezuela. It was additionally released at some point in other countries, such as Mexico, where it was named the Magnavox Odisea. Clone versions were released by other manufacturers such as the Overkal in Spain, released commercially in early 1974 by Inter Electrónica. The Overkal was developed in 1973 by electronics engineer Felipe Mor Pérez, and was modified to select games through push-buttons, removing the use of game cards. It may have been the first console produced in Europe. In 1974, Odyssey appeared in the Sears Wish Book. Magnavox sold 89,000 consoles in total in 1973, 129,000 Odyssey units in 1974, and 80,000 units in 1975. According to Baer the company sold 350,000 Odysseys in total worldwide, though Fritsche stated it reached 367,000. The light gun peripheral sold 20,000 units.

== Legacy ==
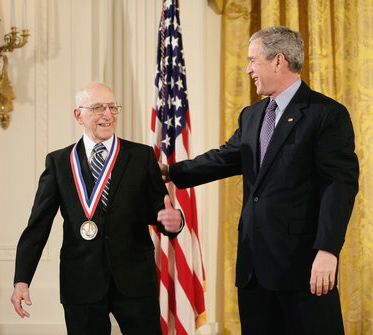
Ralph Baer being given the National Medal of Technology in February 2006

Although there was continued customer demand for the console, Magnavox discontinued production of the Odyssey in the fall of 1975. Rising inflation had raised the manufacturing cost of the system to Magnavox from roughly US$37 to US$47 (equivalent to about $280 in 2025), and Magnavox was unable to raise the retail price to match. Instead, it sought a cheaper alternative; in May 1974 it signed a contract with Texas Instruments for integrated circuits to replace the transistors and diodes of the original system, and designed a limited version of the console around them. The result was the first of several dedicated consoles—consoles that could only play games built into the system—in the Magnavox Odyssey series, the Magnavox Odyssey 100 and Magnavox Odyssey 200, as part of the first generation of video game consoles; the Odyssey 100 was only capable of playing the ping-pong and hockey games from the original Odyssey, while the 200 also had the handball game and a rudimentary on-screen scoring system. The 100 and 200 were released in November 1975 to replace the Odyssey for US$69.95 (equivalent to about $420 in 2025) and US$109.95 (equivalent to about $660 in 2025), respectively. Eleven dedicated Odyssey consoles were produced before a follow-up non-dedicated console in 1978, the Magnavox Odyssey 2.

While it showed the potential of video game consoles and was an early part of the rise of the commercial video game industry, the Odyssey is not generally considered a major commercial success. Magnavox produced no more games for the console after 1973 and rejected proposals for different versions of the console or accessories. While a few clone systems were produced in limited quantities, and multiple dedicated systems—generally focused on ping-pong game variants—were created by several companies, no other home video consoles capable of playing separately-produced games were released until the 1976 Fairchild Semiconductor Channel F.

Due to his work on the Odyssey, Baer has been referred to as the "Father of Video Games". In 2004, Baer was awarded the National Medal of Technology for "his groundbreaking and pioneering creation, development and commercialization of interactive video games, which spawned related uses, applications, and mega-industries in both the entertainment and education realms". The Museum of Modern Art (MoMA) added the Magnavox Odyssey to its permanent collection of video games in 2013. MoMA's Paul Galloway described the console as "a masterpiece of engineering and industrial design" and stated that it was "hard to overstate the importance of [Ralph Baer's] place in the birth of the industry". The Brown Box prototype and the TV Game #1 prototype are located in Washington, D.C. at the Smithsonian Institution's National Museum of American History.

=== Lawsuits ===
Patent drawing for the Magnavox Odyssey

In May 1972, Nutting Associates chief engineer Nolan Bushnell, designer of the first commercial arcade video game, Computer Space, saw a demonstration of the Odyssey. Inspired, when he and Ted Dabney quit Nutting to found Atari, he assigned Allan Alcorn to create a cheap ping-pong arcade game as a training exercise, though he did not tell Alcorn that it was for training nor that the idea was based on the Odyssey Table Tennis game. Alcorn soon developed Pong (1972), which Bushnell recognized as a potential hit, and it became the company's first game. Pong was very successful, and in turn helped drive sales of the Odyssey; Baer noted that customers bought the console because of Table Tennis, in turn because of Pong, and joked that they may as well have stopped designing games after that game card. In April 1974, however, Magnavox sued Atari along with several competitors, including Allied Leisure, Bally Midway, and arcade distributor Empire, for infringing on its patents for video games played on a television screen. Two more lawsuits joined it by 1975, against Sears, Nutting, Williams Electronics, and others. Baer later stated that the lawsuits were not filed right away because Magnavox and Sanders needed to wait until they could expect to be awarded more money than it would cost to pursue the suits. The root of the conflict was a set of patents by Baer and the development team—particularly a pair which described how the Odyssey showed player-controlled objects, or dots, on a video monitor and described a number of games that could be played with the system, with one patent by Baer and one by Rusch.

The judge, John Grady, ruled in early 1977 that Baer's patent for the Odyssey constituted "the pioneering patent of the video game art", held the defendants' games as infringing, and set a precedent that any video game where a machine-controlled visual element hit and bounced off a player-controlled element violated Rusch's patent. At the time of judgement, only Seeburg Corporation and Chicago Dynamic Industries—though bankrupt—remained out of the defendants of the initial three lawsuits, with all other companies having settled out of court. Atari's settlement, made in June 1976, granted it a license in exchange for US$1.5 million (equivalent to $10.9 million) and access granted to Magnavox to all technology produced by Atari from June 1976 to June 1977; other defendants paid higher penalties. Over the next twenty years, Sanders and Magnavox sued several other companies over the issue, focusing on "paddle-and-ball" type games like Pong and Table Tennis that more clearly violated the patent; the final lawsuits ended in the mid-1990s. Defendants included Coleco, Mattel, Seeburg, and Activision; Sanders and Magnavox won or settled every lawsuit. Many of the defendants unsuccessfully attempted to claim that the patents only applied to the specific hardware implementations that Baer had used, or that they were invalidated by prior computer or electronic games. In 1985, Nintendo sued in an effort to invalidate the patents, claiming as prior art the 1958 Tennis for Two game built by William Higinbotham. The court, however, ruled that the oscilloscope-based game did not use video signals and therefore did not qualify as a video game, and ruled again in favor of Magnavox and Sanders. Magnavox won more than US$100 million in the various lawsuits and settlements involving the Odyssey related patents before they expired in the early 1990s.

== Games ==
A total of 28 games distributed on 11 different game cards were released for the Magnavox Odyssey. 13 games were included with the console—a set of 12 in America and a different set of 10 in other countries—with six others available for purchase either individually or in a bundle; the additional games primarily used the same game cards with different screen overlays and instructions. Another game, Percepts, was available for free to players that sent in a survey card. A light gun accessory, Shooting Gallery, was available for purchase, and included four games on two cards that used the rifle. A final four games were released for sale in 1973. The console does not enforce game rules or keep track of scores for the games; that is left up to the players.

Games
Title	Game card	Description	US version	International version
Table Tennis	1	Two players use paddles to knock a ball back and forth on a screen; does not use an overlay	Included with console	Included with console
Ski	2	One player moves a dot representing a skier back and forth as they go down a mountain path; players must keep track of their own time and penalties	Included with console	Included with console
Simon Says	2	A three-player game where two players must race to touch the body part of their chosen character's picture when the third player tells them to, based on a deck of Simon Says cards	Included with console	Included with console
Tennis	3	Two players use paddles to knock a ball back and forth on a screen; uses an overlay of a tennis court and players are intended to follow the rules of tennis	Included with console	Included with console
Analogic	3	A math game where players can move to either square depicted on the overlay based on if the number on the square is even or odd and is the sum of the other player's move and another number	Included with console	Included with console
Hockey	3	Two players use paddles to knock a ball back and forth on a screen; uses an overlay of a hockey rink and players score only if the puck reaches the opponent's goal on the overlay	Included with console	Included with console
Football	3, 4	Two players use a combination of on-screen movement, dice, and play cards to simulate a game of football; kickoff, passing, and punting plays use Card #3 while running plays use Card #4	Included with console	—N/a
Cat and Mouse	4	A two-player chase game played on a grid, with the mouse attempting to return to its house before the cat catches it	Included with console	Sold separately
Haunted House	4	A two-player chase game played on a haunted house overlay, with the detective trying to collect all of the clue cards without being caught by the ghost	Included with console	Sold separately
Submarine	5	A target shooting game, with one player moving a submarine along shipping lanes and the other player using their spot as a torpedo	Included with console	Included with console
Roulette	6	A game of chance where players bet with chips, and randomly spin their controller dial to launch a spot at a roulette wheel overlay	Included with console	Sold separately
States	6	An educational game played with an overlay of the United States and a deck of fifty trivia cards with questions about each state	Included with console	—N/a
Fun Zoo	2	A racing game using an overlay of a zoo, with a third player drawing animal cards for the players to race to	Sold separately	—N/a
Baseball	3	Two players use a combination of on-screen movement, dice, and play cards to simulate a game of baseball	Sold separately	—N/a
Invasion	4, 5, 6	A combination of strategic moves made on a separate game board and tactical combat resolved on the screen; different assaults use different cards	Sold separately	—N/a
Wipeout	5	A racing game using both a track overlay and a game board; the game board keeps track of laps and the second player's dot along with the ball dot keeps time	Sold separately	Included with console
Volleyball	7	Two players use paddles to knock a ball back and forth on a screen; uses an overlay of a volleyball court, and players must knock the ball over the net for scores to count	Sold separately	Included with console
Soccer	3	Two players use paddles to knock a ball back and forth on a screen; uses an overlay of a soccer court and players score only if the ball reaches the opponent's goal on the overlay	—N/a	Included with console
Handball	8	Two players use paddles to knock a ball back and forth on a screen; it uses an overlay of a handball court, and players are both on the same side of the screen with a wall on the other side	Sold separately	—N/a
Prehistoric Safari	9	One player sets their dot on overlays of prehistoric animals, while the other player attempts to shoot the dot with the light gun in as few shots as possible	Sold with light gun	Sold with light gun
Dogfight!	9	One player moves their dot along a flight path on the overlay, while the other player attempts to shoot it with the light gun	Sold with light gun	Sold with light gun
Shootout!	9	One player is a bandit in an Old West town, and moves along a path, stopping at windows for the other player to try to shoot with the light gun	Sold with light gun	Sold with light gun
Shooting Gallery	10	The overlay contains rows of shooting gallery targets, and the player attempts to shoot the computer-controlled dot with the light gun as it moves over them	Sold with light gun	Sold with light gun
Percepts	2	A racing game in which the overlay has squares containing patterns and symbols on them; players race to the correct square when the corresponding card is drawn from a deck	Free with survey	—N/a
Brain Wave	3	A complicated strategy game using cards and dice	Sold separately (1973)	—N/a
W.I.N.	4	Players move their dot to symbols on the overlay to fill out their "Win card", while their dot is invisible until the reset button is pressed	Sold separately (1973)	—N/a
Basketball	8	Two players use paddles to knock a ball back and forth on a screen; uses an overlay of a basketball court	Sold separately (1973)	—N/a
Interplanetary Voyage	12	The player guides their dot, which has momentum, to planets to complete missions given by cards with a maximum number of moves allowed	Sold separately (1973)	—N/a

== Sources ==
- Baer, Ralph H. (2005). Videogames: In the Beginning. Rolenta Press. ISBN 978-0-9643848-1-1.
- DeMaria, Rusel; Wilson, Johnny L. (2003). High Score!: The Illustrated History of Electronic Games (2nd ed.). McGraw Hill/Osborne. ISBN 978-0-07-223172-4.
- Donovan, Tristan (April 20, 2010). Replay: The History of Video Games. Yellow Ant. ISBN 978-0-9565072-0-4.
- Goldberg, Marty; Vendel, Curt (2012). Atari Inc.: Business Is Fun. Syzygy Press. ISBN 978-0-9855974-0-5.
- Gorges, Florent (2018). L'histoire de Nintendo (in French) (Nouvelle éd. améliorée et augmentée ed.). Omaké Books. ISBN 978-2-919603-43-5.
- Smith, Alexander (2019). They Create Worlds: The Story of the People and Companies That Shaped the Video Game Industry. Vol. 1: 1971–1982. CRC Press. ISBN 978-1-138-38990-8.
- Wolf, Mark J. P. (2007). The Video Game Explosion: A History from PONG to PlayStation and Beyond. Greenwood Publishing Group. ISBN 978-0-313-33868-7.
- Wolf, Mark J. P. (2012). Before the Crash: Early Video Game History. Wayne State University Press. ISBN 978-0-8143-3450-8.
