= First generation of video game consoles =

Gaming generation from 1972 to 1983

In the history of video games, the first generation era includes video games, video game consoles, and handheld video game consoles available from 1972 to 1983. Notable consoles of the first generation include the Odyssey series (excluding the Magnavox Odyssey 2), the Atari Home Pong, the Coleco Telstar series and the Color TV-Game series. The generation ended with the Computer TV-Game in 1980 and its following discontinuation in 1983, but many manufacturers had left the market prior due to the market decline in the year of 1978 and the start of the second generation of video game consoles.

Most of the games developed during this generation were hard-wired into the consoles and unlike later generations, most were not contained on removable media that the user could switch between. Consoles often came with accessories and cartridges that could alter the way the game played to enhance the gameplay experience as graphical capabilities consisted of simple geometry such as dots, lines or blocks that would occupy only a single screen. First generation consoles were not capable of displaying more than two colours until later in the generation, and audio capabilities were limited with some consoles having no sound at all.

In 1972, two major developments influenced the future of the home video game market. In June, Nolan Bushnell and Ted Dabney founded Atari, which would go on to be one of the most well-known video game companies and play a vital role in the early generations of consoles. In September, Magnavox, an established electronics company, released the Odyssey. Inspired by the Odyssey's ping-pong game, Atari would soon go on to market the game Pong in both arcade and home versions; Nintendo, a well-established Japanese company that made a number of different products including but not limited to playing cards and toys, entered the video game console market for the first time in 1977 with its Color TV-Game series.

== Overview ==
=== History ===
In 1951, Ralph Baer conceived the idea of an interactive television while designing a television set for Loral in the Bronx, New York. Baer did not pursue the idea, but it returned to him in August 1966 when he was the Chief Engineer and manager of the Equipment Design Division at Sanders Associates. By December 1966, he and a technician created a prototype that allowed a player to move a line across the screen. After a demonstration to the company's director of research and development, some funding was allotted and the project was made official. Baer spent the next few months designing further prototypes, and in February 1967 assigned technician Bill Harrison to begin building the project. Harrison spent the next few months in between other projects building out successive modifications to the prototype. Baer, meanwhile, collaborated with engineer Bill Rusch on the design of the console, including developing the basis of many games for the system. By May, the first game was developed and by June, multiple games were completed for what was then a second prototype box. This included a game where players controlled dots chasing each other and a light gun shooter game with a plastic rifle. By August 1967, Baer and Harrison had completed a third prototype machine, but Baer felt that he was not proving successful at designing fun games for the system; to make up for this he added Bill Rusch, who had helped him come up with the initial games for the console, to the project. He soon proved his value to the team by coming up with a way to display three dots on the screen at once rather than the previous two, and proposing the development of a ping pong game.

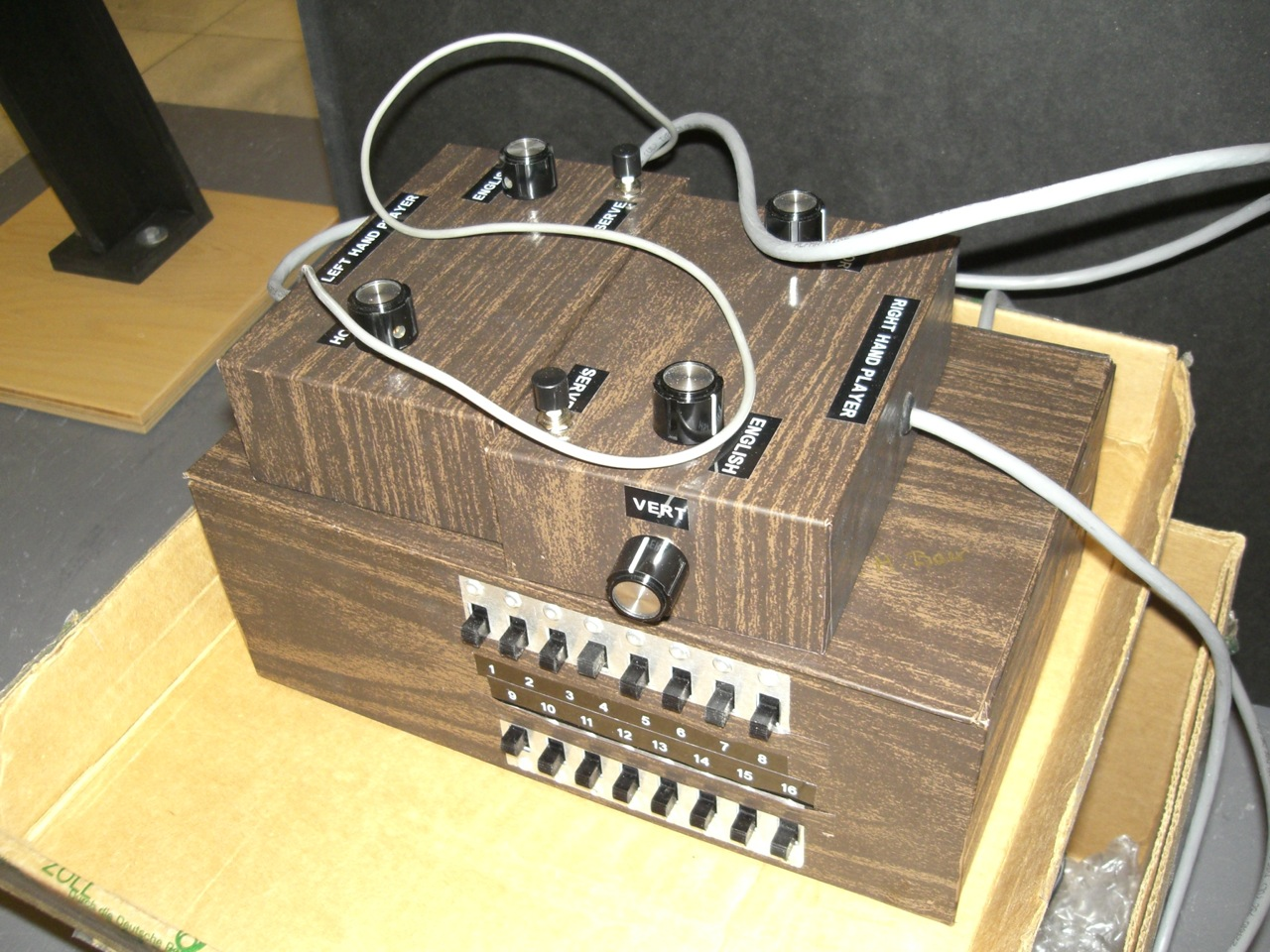
The "Brown Box" prototype is the forerunner of the Magnavox Odyssey, the first commercial home video game console.

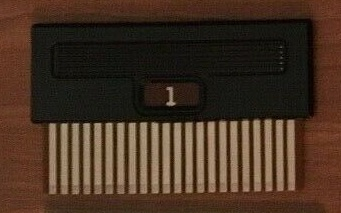
First cartridge of Magnavox Odyssey

As Sanders was a military contractor and not in the business of making and selling commercial electronics, the team approached several cable television industry companies to produce the console, but were unable to find a buyer. By January 1969 the team had produced the seventh prototype, nicknamed the "Brown Box". After a Sanders patent attorney recommended approaching television manufacturers, they found interest first at RCA and finally at Magnavox, who entered negotiations in July 1969 and signed an agreement in January 1971. Magnavox designed the exterior of the machine, and re-engineered some of the internals with consultation from Baer and Harrison; they removed the ability to display color, reduced the number of controller types, and changed the system of selecting games from a dial to separate game cards that modified the console's circuitry when plugged into the console. Magnavox named the console the Magnavox Odyssey and announced the system's launch date for September 1972.

In the late 1960s, Nolan Bushnell saw Spacewar! at Stanford University. Spacewar! is a 1962 mainframe game developed by a group of students and employees at the Massachusetts Institute of Technology. Bushnell had worked at an amusement park, and felt that an arcade game version of the game would be very popular. The high price of computers capable of running the game, however, meant that any such arcade game would not be economically feasible. By 1970, however, minicomputers were beginning to come down in price. He and his office mate, Ted Dabney, agreed to work together to try and design a prototype of the game. By the end of November 1970, the pair had abandoned the project as untenable, as economically feasible computers were not powerful enough. Dabney soon thought of a way to manipulate the video signal on the screen without a computer controlling it, and from there Syzygy Engineering came up with the idea of removing the computer altogether and building specialized hardware to handle everything for the game instead. Computer Space, the first commercial arcade video game, was released by the pair as Syzygy Engineering through Nutting Associates at the end of 1971 and after its release they incorporated as Atari in the following year and began designing more games. Bushnell saw a demonstration of the Odyssey console playing its Table Tennis game in early 1972 and assigned their first employee, Allan Alcorn, to produce an arcade table tennis game. The result, Pong, was the first major arcade video game success, and inspired a large number of arcade and dedicated console versions and clones, including Atari's Home Pong in 1975.

=== Technology ===
The first generation of consoles did not contain a microprocessor and were based on custom codeless state machine computers consisting of discrete logic (TTL) circuits comprising each element of the game itself. Over the generation, technology steadily improved and later consoles of the generation moved the bulk of the circuitry to custom integrated circuits such as Atari's custom Pong chips and General Instruments' AY-3-8500 series.

Graphical capabilities were limited throughout the generation, often supported with physical accessories and screen overlays, but saw some improvement towards the end of the generation. While the Odyssey could only display 3 square dots in black and white, as the generation progressed, consoles started being able to display color as well as more complex shapes and text. Early consoles such as the Odyssey and TV Tennis Electrotennis required players to keep track of scores manually but later, many introduced score counters on the display to assist players in score tracking. Audio capabilities were slow to improve over the generation, starting with the Odyssey, which had no audio, and later moving on to consoles which had buzzers that could produce a small range of beeps and buzzes.

=== Market saturation and the end of the generation ===
In 1976, General Instrument produced a series of affordable integrated chips that allowed companies to simplify console production and lower costs. Due to this, many companies had entered the home console market by the late 1970s. A significant number released consoles that were essentially clones of Atari's Home Pong and many were poorly made and rushed to market, causing the home console market to saturate. The demand for the chip was so high that General Instruments could not supply enough to satisfy all the orders it was receiving, causing problems for some smaller companies. Coleco received their order early on, allowing them to build up strong production capabilities and have success with their Telstar range.

The start of the second generation and the next major advancement in home console technology began in 1976 with the release of the Fairchild Channel F. The technology behind the first generation quickly became obsolete as consumers had the ability to purchase new games for second generation consoles instead of having to purchase new systems when they wanted new content as with the dedicated consoles of the first generation. As people transitioned to the newer systems, some companies were left with surplus stock and were selling at a loss. The combination of market saturation and the start of the second generation caused many companies to leave the market completely. Sales of second generation consoles were only modest for the next few years until the arrival of the killer app, the home port of Space Invaders for the Atari VCS in 1980.

== Home systems ==
Many consoles in the first generation were clones of or styled similarly to the arcade version of Pong (above).

There were hundreds of home video game consoles known to have existed in the first generation of video games. This section lists the most notable.

=== Odyssey series ===
In September 1972, Magnavox released the world's first home video game console, the Magnavox Odyssey. It came packaged with board game paraphernalia such as cards, paper money and dice to enhance the games. It had features that became industry standard in subsequent generations such as detachable controllers, light gun accessories and interchangeable game media. While no game data was stored on the circuit cards as they would be in future consoles, they could be used to select one of the twelve games built onto the hardware. Magnavox licensed its video game patents to other companies for a fee and prosecuted companies who released consoles without a licensing agreement.

It was with the Odyssey that Nintendo first became involved in the home video game market. According to Martin Picard in the International Journal of Computer Game Research: "in 1971, Nintendo had – even before the marketing of the first home console in the United States – an alliance with the American pioneer Magnavox to develop and produce optoelectronic guns for the Odyssey, since it was similar to what Nintendo was able to offer in the Japanese toy market in [the] 1970s."

In 1974 North American Philips purchased Magnavox and released a series of eight Odyssey consoles in North America from 1975 to 1977. All of them were dedicated consoles, and each subsequent release was an improvement over the previous, adding features such as additional game variations, on-screen displays, and player-controlled handicaps such as smaller paddle sizes and variable ball speed. Three Odyssey series consoles were also released in Europe with similar features from 1976 to 1978.

=== TV Tennis Electrotennis ===
On September 12, 1975, several months before the release of Home Pong in North America, Epoch released Japan's first home console, the TV Tennis Electrotennis. The technology was licensed from Magnavox and it contained a single ball and paddle style game that resembled Pong but without an onscreen score display. The game controls were contained within the base unit and it connected to a television set through an ultra high frequency (UHF) antenna, as opposed to being directly connected, which was unique to the console at the time. Compared to popular consoles of the generation, it performed poorly with an approximate 20,000 units sold.

=== Atari Home Pong ===
In late 1975 Atari released a home version of their popular arcade game Pong. It had been in development since 1974 under the lead of Allan Alcorn and Harold Lee. By the end of 1975, Atari had become a major company in the home console market due to Home Pong. Following Pong's success, Magnavox filed suit against Atari for infringement on its technology patents and ended up settling out of court with Atari becoming a licensee of Magnavox.

Home video games achieved widespread popularity with the release of a home version of Pong and its success sparked hundreds of clones, including the Coleco Telstar, which went on to be a success in its own right with over a dozen models.

=== Coleco Telstar series ===
Starting in 1976, Coleco released a series of fourteen dedicated consoles up until 1978, when they suffered a significant loss due to the combination of dock workers' strike, preventing it from shipping the final product in time for the holidays, and the start of the second generation. The series featured a number of different styles of ball games and external accessories to enhance gameplay such as the Telstar Arcade, which had a unique triangular design that came with a light gun and steering wheel attached to the casing. The series was marketed at a lower price than its competitors and sold well with over a million sales.

=== Color TV-Game series ===
In the late 1970s, Nintendo released a series of five consoles for the Japanese market. The first of the series and the first console created by Nintendo, the Color TV-Game 6, was released in 1977 and contained six ball-and-paddle games. The last, the Computer TV-Game, was a 1980 port of Nintendo's first arcade game, Computer Othello. The third console in the series, the Color TV-Game Racing 112, was the first project of Shigeru Miyamoto, who would go on to become the creator of some of the most well-known video game franchises.

=== Comparison ===
Comparison of first-generation video game home consoles
Name		Magnavox Odyssey	Odyssey series (11 consoles) (Note: Includes the Odyssey 100/200/300/400/500/2000/3000/4000 and Philips Odyssey 200/2001/2100)	TV Tennis Electrotennis
Manufacturer		Magnavox	Magnavox, Philips	Epoch Co.
Image				
Release date		NA: September 1972; UK: 1973; EU: 1974; JP: 1974	NA: 1975–1977	JP: September 12, 1975
Launch price	US$	US$99 (equivalent to $760 in 2025)	US$100–230 (equivalent to $600–1380 in 2025)	US$66 (equivalent to $390 in 2025)
Launch price	GBP	£79 (equivalent to £860 in 2025)		
Launch price	JP¥			JP¥19,500 (equivalent to ¥39,840 in 2024)
Media		Printed circuit board	Inbuilt chip	Inbuilt chip
Accessories (retail)		Light gun (sold separately)	None	None
Sales		350,000	Unknown	20,000

Name		Home Pong series (9 models)	Coleco Telstar series (14 models) (Note: Includes the Coleco Telstar, Classic, Deluxe, Ranger, Alpha, Colormatic, Regent, Sportsman, Combat!, Colortron, Marksman, Galaxy, Gemini and Arcade)	Color TV-Game series (5 consoles) (Note: Includes the Color TV-Game 6, 15, Racing 112, Blockbreaker and Computer TV-Game)
Manufacturer		Atari, Sears Tele-Games	Coleco	Nintendo
Image				
Release date		NA: Late 1975; JP: Late 1975	NA: 1976–1978	JP: 1977–1983
Launch price	US$	US$98.95 (equivalent to $590 in 2025)	US$50 (equivalent to $280 in 2025)	US$36–179 (equivalent to $210–700 in 2025)
Launch price	GBP			
Launch price	JP¥	JP¥24,800 (equivalent to ¥50,700 in 2024)		JP¥9800–48,000 (equivalent to ¥16,940–71,130 in 2024)
Media		Inbuilt chip	Inbuilt chip (most models); Cartridge (Telstar Arcade, 1977)	Inbuilt chip
Accessories (retail)		None	Controller styles	None
Sales		150,000	1 million	3 million

== Handheld systems ==
Ralph Baer and Howard Morrison invented and patented an electronic toy that was later licensed to Milton Bradley and sold as Simon in 1978.

All of the handheld systems from the first generation are dedicated consoles and started late into the first generation. It was not until the second generation and the release of the Microvision that players could purchase games separately for the systems. The early dedicated handheld consoles were eventually eclipsed in popularity by programmable video games, which became popular in the fourth generation with the introduction of the Game Boy.

One notable example is the Mattel handheld game series, which were released from 1976 to 1982. The first to be released were Mattel Auto Race and Mattel Football, while some of the latter models like the Mattel Speed Freak and the Mattel Competition Football handhelds are closer to the end of the first generation (1982). They were followed by other titles based on sports and some licensed properties such as Battlestar Galactica. Each game had basic controls, a simple LED interface and a buzzer for sound. The series was popular, sold well and, at times, was difficult to find due to high demand.

In the same year, Coleco began to release handheld consoles after the end of the Telstar home console series. They released Electronic Quarterback, which expanded on the popular American football style games by adding new features. Alongside Mattel Football, it became the other popular sports game of the period.

== See also ==
- 1970s in video games
- Home computer
- History of computing hardware (1960s–present)
