= Paddle (game controller) =

One-dimensional game controller

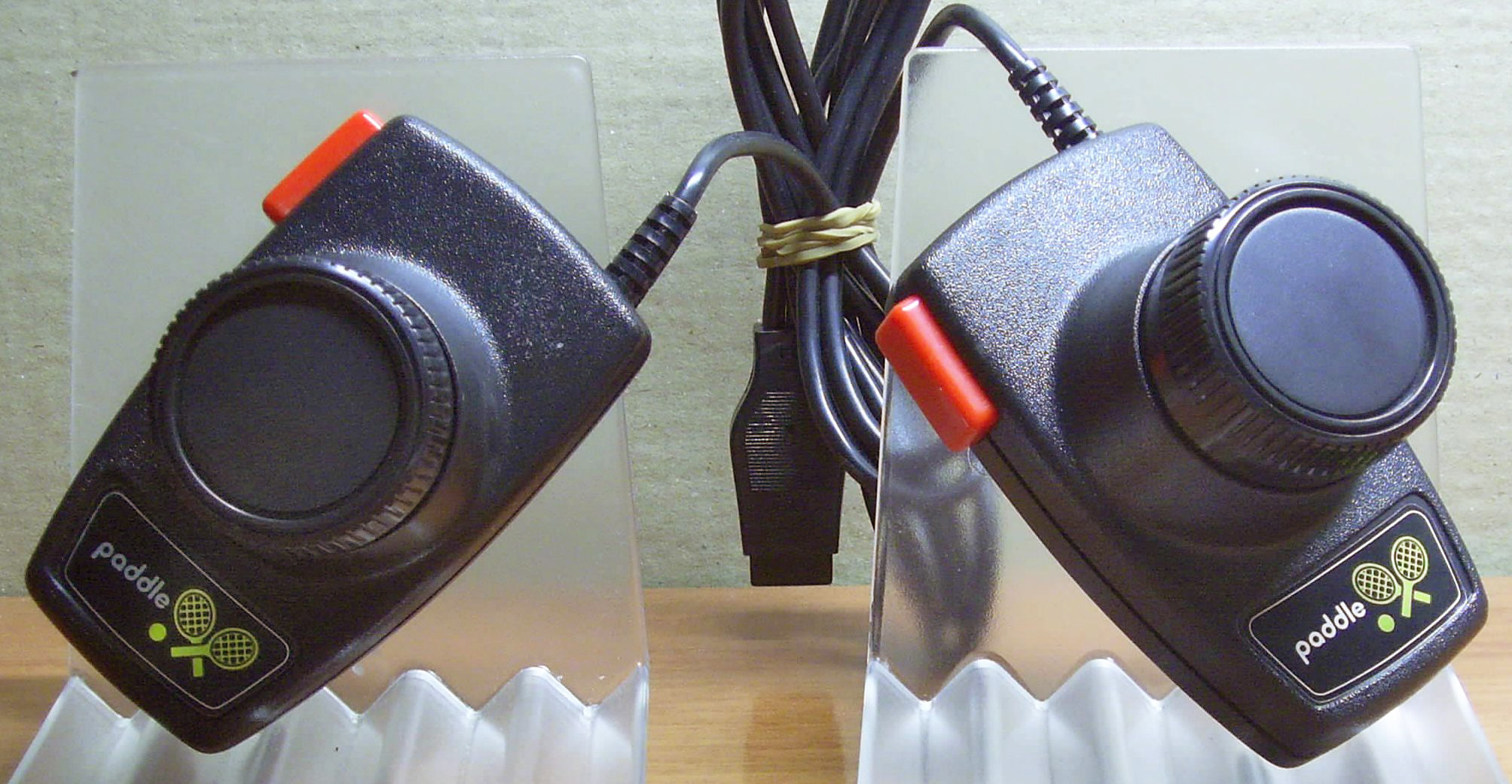
Two Paddles for the Atari 2600

A paddle is a game controller with a round wheel or dial and one or more fire buttons, where the wheel is typically used to control movement of the player object along one axis of the video screen. A paddle controller rotates through a fixed arc (usually about 330 degrees); it has a stop at each end.

The name paddle is derived from the first game that used it, Pong, being a video game simulation of table tennis, whose racquets are commonly called paddles. Even though the simulated paddles appeared on-screen (as small line segments), it was the hand controllers used to move the line segments that actually came to bear the name.

Some famous video games using paddles are Pong, Breakout, and Night Driver.

== Design ==
The paddle wheel is usually mechanically coupled to a potentiometer, so as to generate an output voltage level varying with the wheel's angle relative to a fixed reference position. A paddle is thus an absolute position controller. That is, without any previous knowledge, the sensor can be read and the result directly indicates the position of the paddle knob. This is in contrast to a rotary encoder-based device or "spinner".

== Applications ==
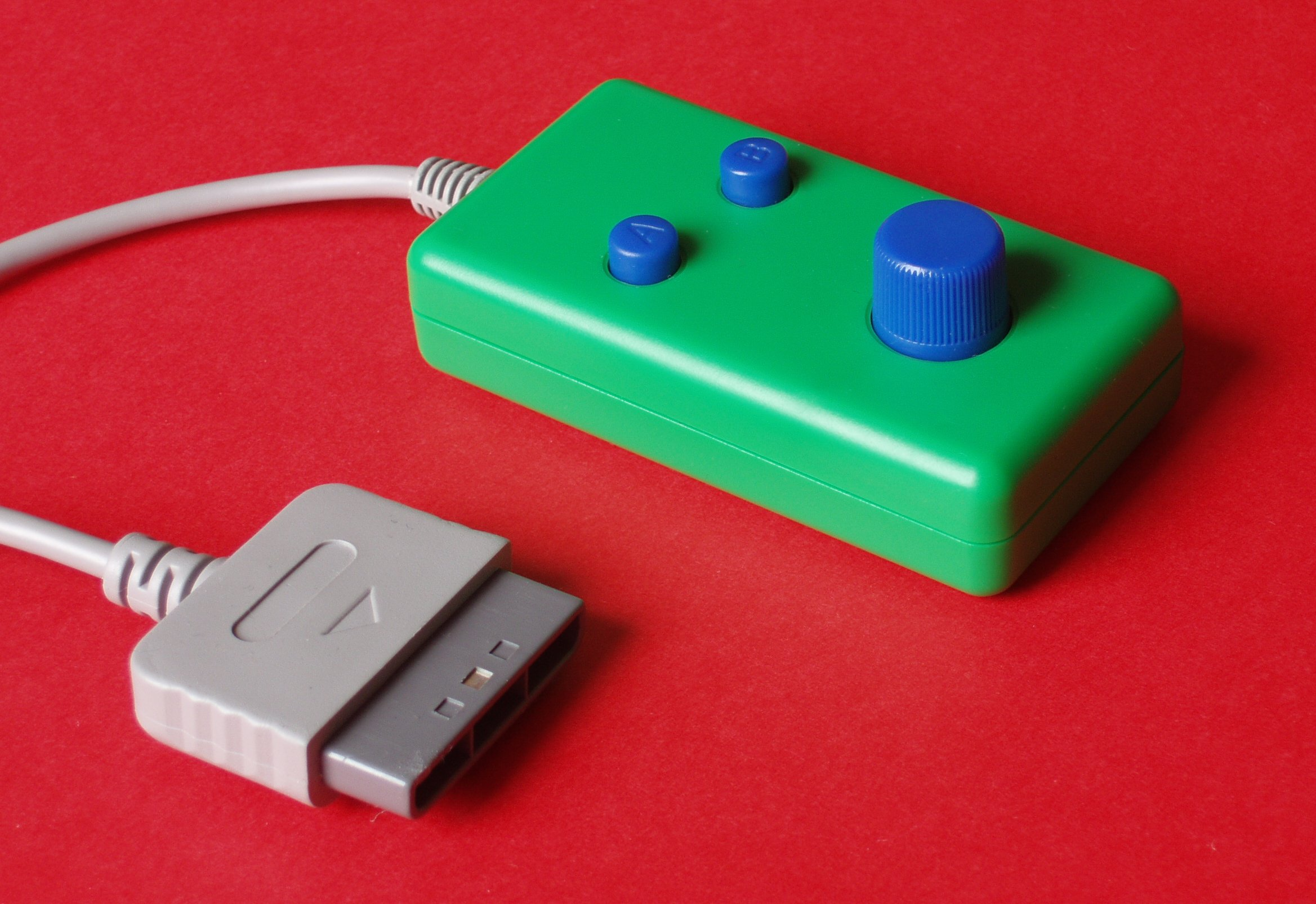
A paddle controller for the Sony PlayStation

Paddles first appeared in video arcade games with Atari Inc.'s Pong in 1972, while the first console to use paddles was Magnavox's Odyssey that same year. The Apple II shipped with paddles until 1980. The Atari 2600 used paddles for several of its games, as did early home computers such as the VIC-20. True (potentiometer-based) paddles are almost never employed any more because they stop reading accurately when the potentiometer contacts get dirty or worn, because turning them too far can break them and because they require more-expensive analog sensing, whereas quadrature encoder-based controllers can be sensed digitally. Any recent game that has paddle-type control uses a quadrature encoder instead, even if the game uses paddles on screen (like Arkanoid).

== Similar controllers ==
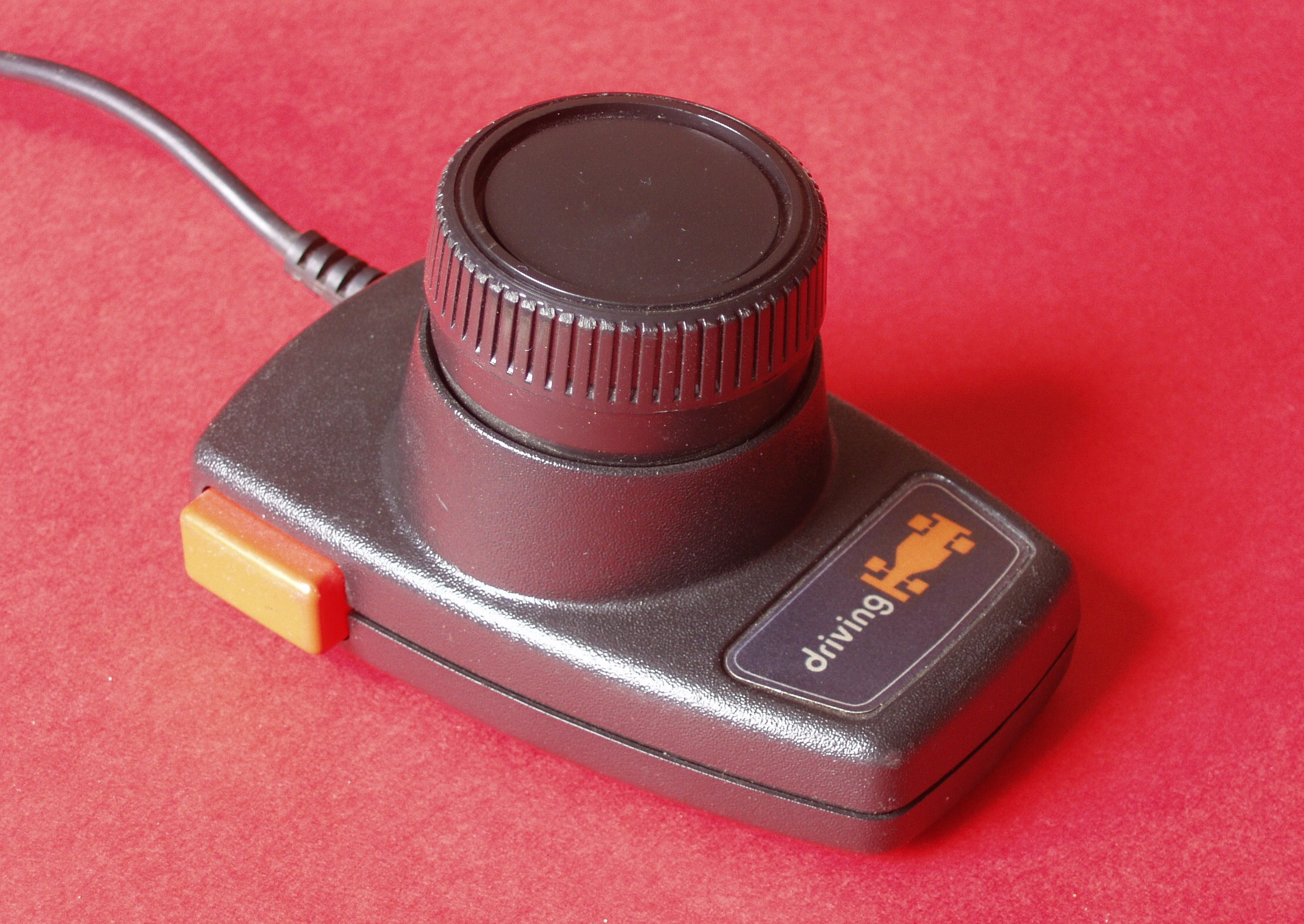
A driving controller for the Atari 2600, similar in appearance to the Atari 2600 paddles

On the Atari 2600, the paddle controllers look very similar to the driving controllers. The driving controllers emulated the steering wheel controls found in contemporary games, where one spun the wheel to cause the car to turn one direction or the other, and stopped the spinning to drive straight. The driving controllers for Atari consoles operated in the same way, although they did not have a wheel, the controller was reduced to a single large knob identical to the one on the paddles.

In comparison to the driving controllers, paddle controllers rotate just under one full rotation before hitting a hard stop. They also come in pairs that plug into a single port, whereas the driving controllers were one to a port. Finally, they have a picture of a tennis racquet and the word "paddle" on it, as opposed to a racing car and the word "driving". Because two controllers connect to each port and the 2600 has two controller ports, four players simultaneously can play in games that support it. The Atari paddles are also compatible with the Atari 8-bit computers, which initially had four controller ports allowing eight paddles. Super Breakout is one example that supported up to 8 players.

Atari also offered driving controllers for use with games like Indy 500, which requires wheels that can spin around continuously in one direction. Driving controllers have a picture of a car and the word "driving" on it and a single controller attaches to each controller port. The driving controller is not compatible with paddle games. Like a mechanical computer mouse, the driving controller is a quadrature encoder-based device and thus only sensed relative position, not absolute position. This controller is functionally identical to the spin-dial controller used in Atari's Tempest arcade game. Since only one controller attaches to each port, only two people can play driving games simultaneously.

Several similar relative spinner controllers have emerged as part of the home-built arcade cabinet scene to facilitate play of such games as Tempest, including spinners from Oscar Controls and the SlikStik Tornado spinner. These devices are typically made to plug directly into a computer as a single-axis mouse.

== See also ==
- DS accessory
- Joystick
- Racing wheel
- Scroll wheel
