= Light gun =

Video game pointing device

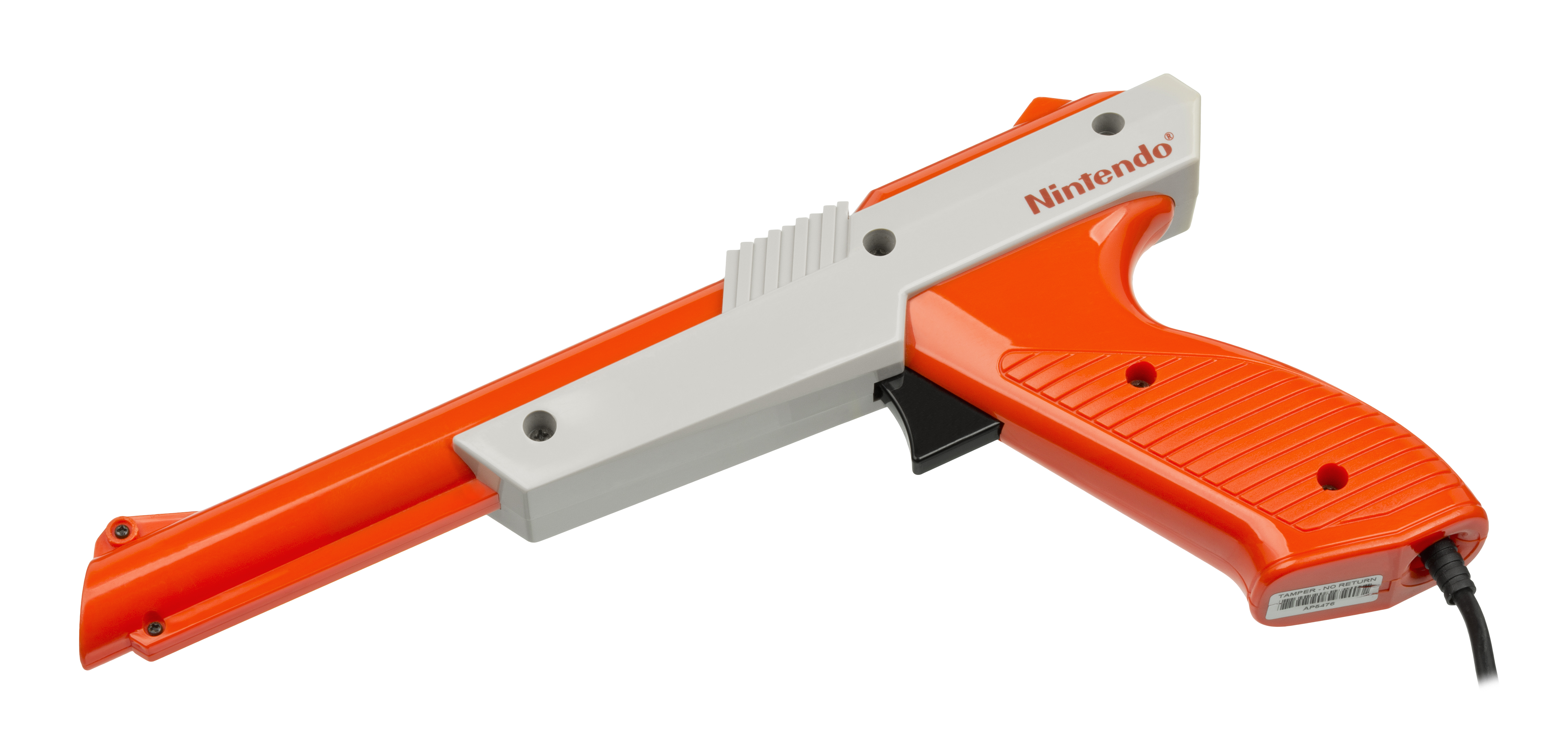
NES Zapper

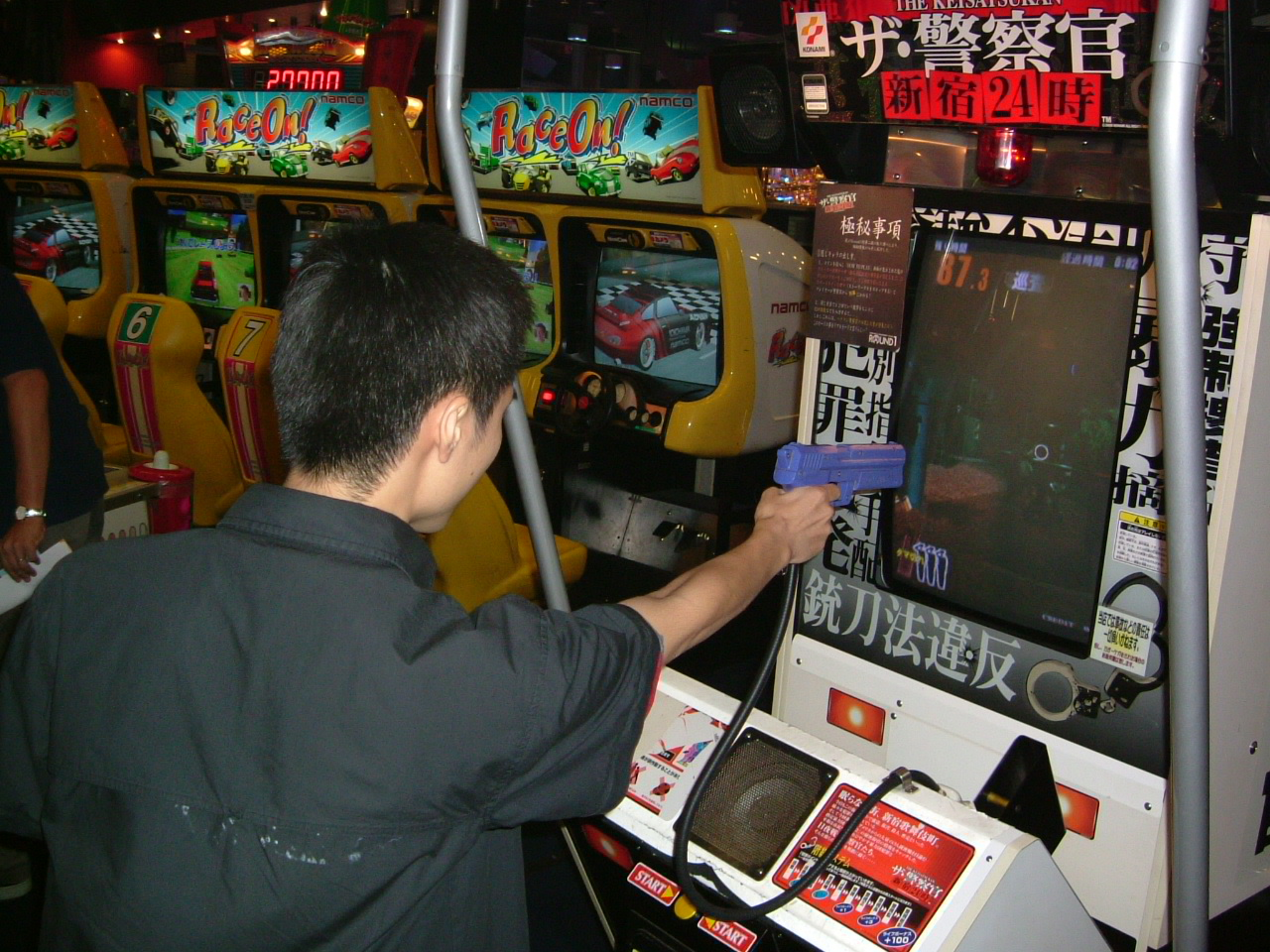
Man using a light gun to aim and shoot in an arcade game

A light gun is a pointing device for computers and a control device for arcade and video games, typically shaped to resemble a pistol.

== History ==
The first light guns were produced in the 1930s, following the development of light-sensing vacuum tubes. In 1936, the technology was introduced in arcade shooting games, beginning with the Seeburg Ray-O-Lite.

These games evolved throughout subsequent decades, culminating in Sega's Periscope, released in 1966 as the company's first successful game, which requires the player to target cardboard ships. Periscope is an early electro-mechanical game, and the first arcade game to cost one quarter per play. Sega's 1969 game Missile features electronic sound and a moving film strip to represent the targets on a projection screen, and its 1972 game Killer Shark features a mounted light gun with targets whose movement and reactions are displayed using back image projection onto a screen. Nintendo released the Beam Gun in 1970 and the Laser Clay Shooting System in 1973, followed in 1974 by the arcade game Wild Gunman, which uses film projection to display the target on the screen. In 1975, Sega released the early co-operative light gun shooters Balloon Gun and Bullet Mark.

=== Sequential targets ===
The first detection method, used by the NES Zapper, involves drawing each target sequentially in white light after the screen blacks out. The computer knows that if the diode detects light as it is drawing a square (or after the screen refreshes), then that is the target at which the gun is pointed. Essentially, the diode tells the computer whether or not the player hit something, and for n objects, the sequence of the drawing of the targets tell the computer which target the player hit after 1 + ceil(log_{2}(n)) refreshes (one refresh to determine if any target at all was hit and ceil(log_{2}(n)) to do a binary search for the object that was hit).

A side effect of this is that in some games, a player can point the gun at a light bulb or other bright light source, pull the trigger, and cause the system to falsely detect a hit on the first target every time. Some games account for this either by detecting if all targets appear to match or by displaying a black screen and verifying that no targets match.

=== Infrared emitters ===
The Wii Remote uses an infrared video camera in the handheld controller, rather than a simple sensor. Wesley Yin-Poole stated that the Wii Remote was not as accurate as a traditional light gun.

GunCon 3 is an infrared light gun used for the PlayStation 3 port of Time Crisis 4.

=== Rectangular positioning ===
Rectangular positioning is similar to image capture, except it disregards any on-screen details and only determines the rectangular outline of the game screen. By determining the size and distortion of the rectangle outline of the screen, it is possible to calculate where exactly the light gun is pointing. This method was introduced by the Sinden Lightgun.

== Positional gun ==
The positional gun is common in video arcades, as a non-optical alternative to a light gun. The positional gun is permanently mounted on a swivel on the cabinet, as an analog joystick for aiming crosshairs onscreen. This is typically more expensive initially but easier to maintain and repair. Positional gun games include Silent Scope, the arcade version of Resident Evil Survivor 2, Space Gun, Revolution X, and Terminator 2: Judgment Day. Console conversions may use light guns.

A positional gun is essentially an analog joystick that records the position of the gun to determine the player's aim on the screen. The gun must be calibrated, which usually happens after powering up. Early examples of a positional gun include Sega's Sea Devil in 1972, Taito's Attack in 1976, and Cross Fire in 1977, and Nintendo's Battle Shark in 1978.

== Third-party light guns ==
Third-party light guns, sometimes clones, are manufactured to be purchased by players who wish to buy them at affordable prices over those made officially by Nintendo or by first-party companies.

In 1988, the Video Shooter was released in the United States by Placo Toys. It was once subjected to copyright controversies on trademark disputes with Nintendo.

In late 1988, the Video Blaster was released in North America by Camerica.

In 1989, Nexoft released the Dominator ProBeam, which was licensed by Nintendo unlike most third-party light guns that were made at the time. It has a scope of accuracy with crosshairs at 25 feet.

== Models ==
- Beam Gun – Nintendo – 1970
- Shooting Gallery – Magnavox Odyssey – 1972
- Laser Clay Shooting System – Nintendo – 1973
- Qwak! – Atari – 1974
- Wonder Wizard – General Home Products – 1976
- ColorSport VIII – Granada – 1976
- GD-1380 – Heathkit – 1976
- TV-Sports 801 – Lloyds – 1976
- Sportsman, Tournament 150, 200, 2000, 2501 – Unisonic – 1976/1976/1977/1977
- Telstar Ranger, Telstar Arcade, Telstar Marksman – Coleco – 1977/1977/1978
- TV Fun Sportsrama – APF Electronics – 1977
- TV Master 6 – Binatone – 1977?
- Visio Matic 101 – CIT Alcatel – 1977
- Model 1199 – Interstate – 1977
- Markint 6 – Markint – 1977
- N20 – Philips – 1977
- Visiomat 11 – Pizon-Bross – 1977
- TV Scoreboard – RadioShack – 1977
- Home T.V. Game – Santron – 1977
- TV game – Sennheiser – 1977
- 105 – Sportron – 1977
- 501 – Starex – 1977
- Mark V-C – Unimex – 1977
- XK 600B – Ingersoll – 1978
- Jeu TV TVG-6 – Klevox – 1978
- OC 5000 Occitane – Société Occitane d'Electronique – 1978
- Videosport – Prinztronic – 1978
- Color TV game – Sands 1978
- Telescore – Groupe SEB – 1978
- Sports Centre, Colour TV game 3600 MK III – Granada plc – 1979
- Color Multi-Spiel – Universum – 1979
- NES Zapper – Nintendo – 1984
- Light Phaser – Sega – 1986
- Magnum Light Phaser - ZX Spectrum - 1987
- XG-1 – Atari (XEGS) – 1987
- Action Max – Worlds of Wonder – 1987
- "Plus-X" Terminator Laser - ASCII - 1989
- LaserScope – Konami – 1990
- Super Scope – Nintendo – 1992
- Menacer – Sega – 1994
- Gamegun - 3DO Interactive Multiplayer
- Peacekeeper Revolver – Philips CD-i – 1994
- GunCon (for the PlayStation) – Namco – 1997
- Stunner - Sega Saturn − 1995
- Dreamcast Light Guns – Sega – 2000–2003
- GunCon 2 (for the PlayStation 2) – Namco – 2001
- Pulse Cannon – Pelican – 2001
- Topgun – EMS – 2005
- Topgun II – EMS – 2007
- GunCon 3 (for the PlayStation 3) – Namco – 2008
- Integrated Pistol – MoProUsa – 2008
- PSVR AIM Controller – Sony Computer Entertainment - 2017
- GUN4IR Lightguns – 2019
- MARS LightGun - PDP - 2019
- Sinden Light Gun – 2020
- Retro Shooter Lightguns - 2023

== See also ==
- Light gun shooter
- List of light gun games
- Laser pistol (sport)
