= Entex =

Entex may refer to:

- Entex Industries, a defunct toy and electronic game manufacturer
  - Entex Adventure Vision, a self-contained cartridge-based video game console
  - Entex Select-A-Game, a handheld game system
- Entex Energy, an oil and gas firm; now CenterPoint Energy
- Entex Building (disambiguation), multiple uses
- Fenthion, sold under the trade name Entex
- Guaifenesin/phenylephrine, trade name Entex, a cold medicine
