= D-pad =

Input device for a video game controller

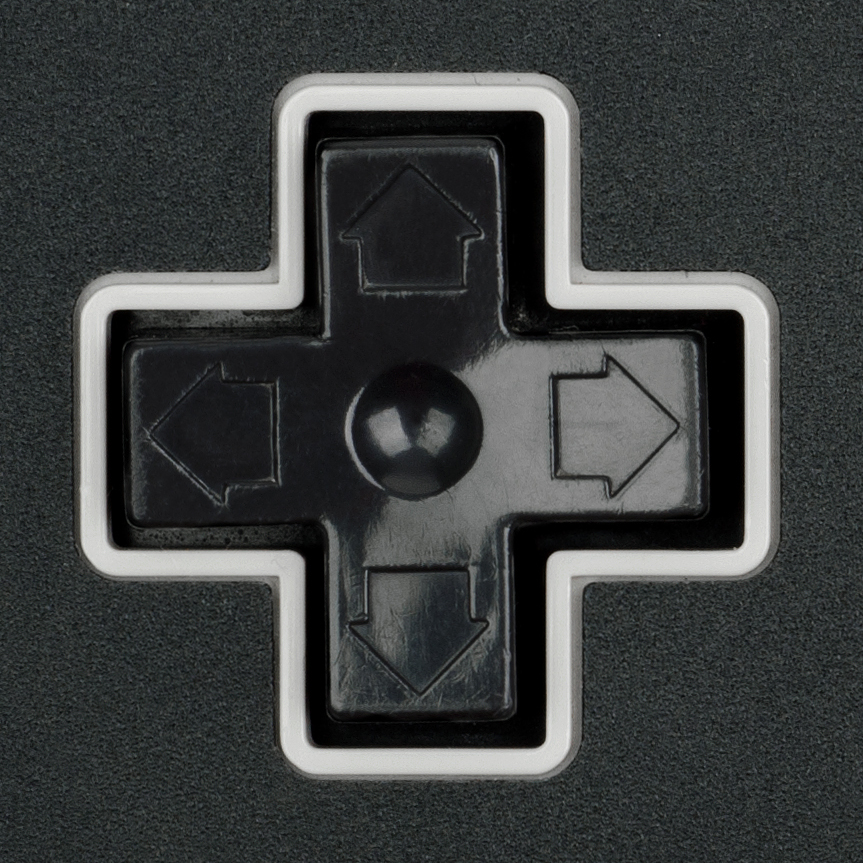
D-pad on the original NES controller (officially called the +Control Pad), which was recognized with an Emmy award

The D-pad (short for directional pad) is a compact input method developed for video games, designed to translate thumb movement into directional control through a flat, cross-shaped surface that rests on four internal switches. Each switch corresponds to a cardinal direction (up, down, left, and right), while diagonal inputs engage two switches simultaneously, enabling eight-directional control at 45-degree intervals. Beneath the center, a pivot mechanism tilts the pad, preventing all four switches from being pressed at once and enhancing tactile feedback.

When introduced, the D-pad offered a space-saving, precise input method at a time when bulky joysticks dominated the market. While analog sticks have largely superseded D-pads as the primary directional input in three-dimensional gamepads, the D-pad's compact, intuitive, and versatile design has led to its adoption in a wide range of devices, including remote controls, calculators, PDAs, mobile phones, and car stereos.

== History ==
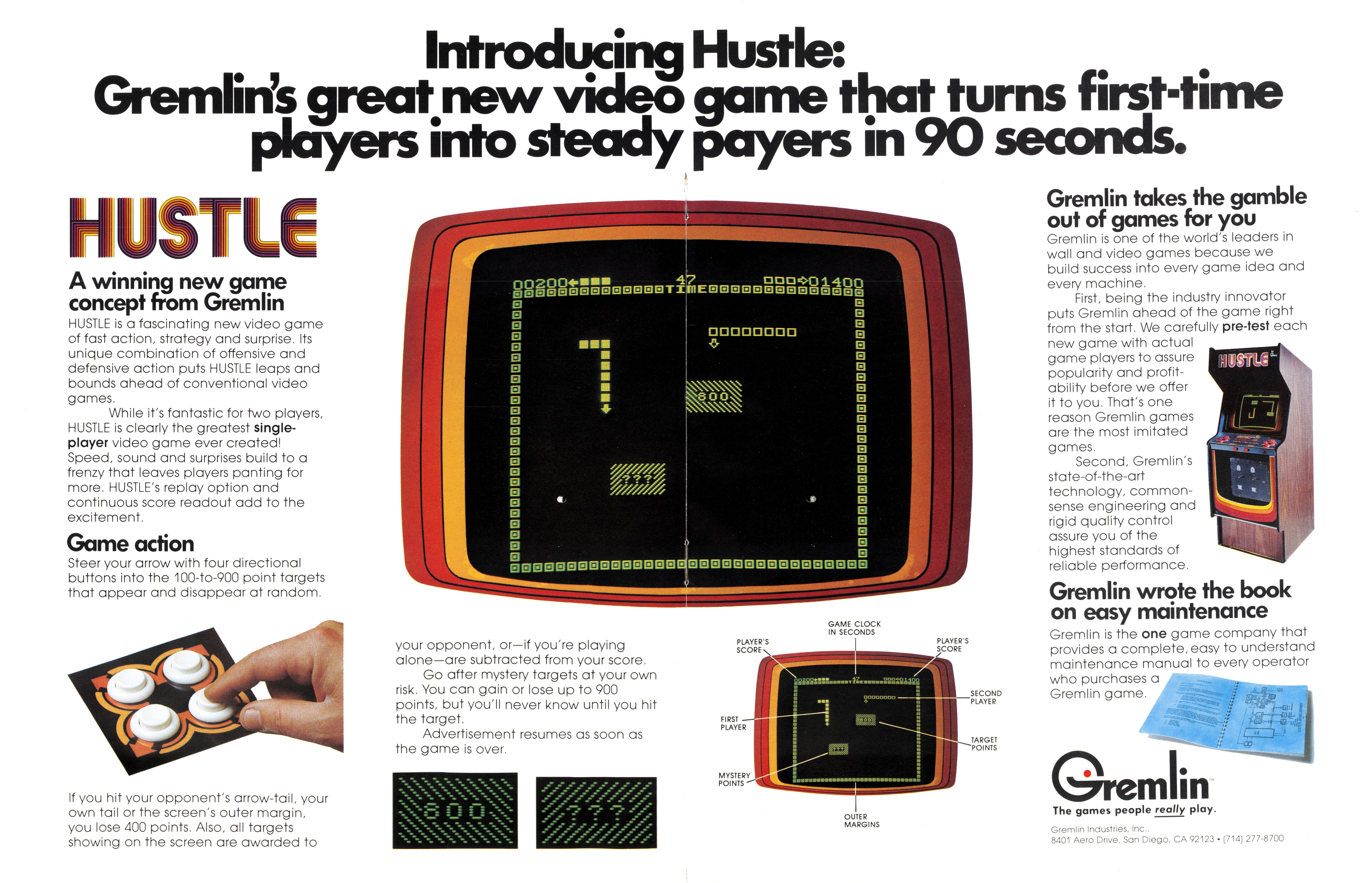
Gremlin's 4-button arcade input method

The precursor to the D-pad was the use of four separate directional buttons. Early arcade games such as Blockade (1976) by Gremlin and Vanguard (1981) by SNK employed this method. Entex's short-lived "Select-A-Game" handheld system featured directional buttons alongside a row of action buttons, as did the unreleased Atari Game Brain and other early consoles like the VideoMaster Star Chess. Milton Bradley's Cosmic Hunter (1981) on the Microvision handheld added a fifth button in the center, all housed beneath a single rubber membrane.

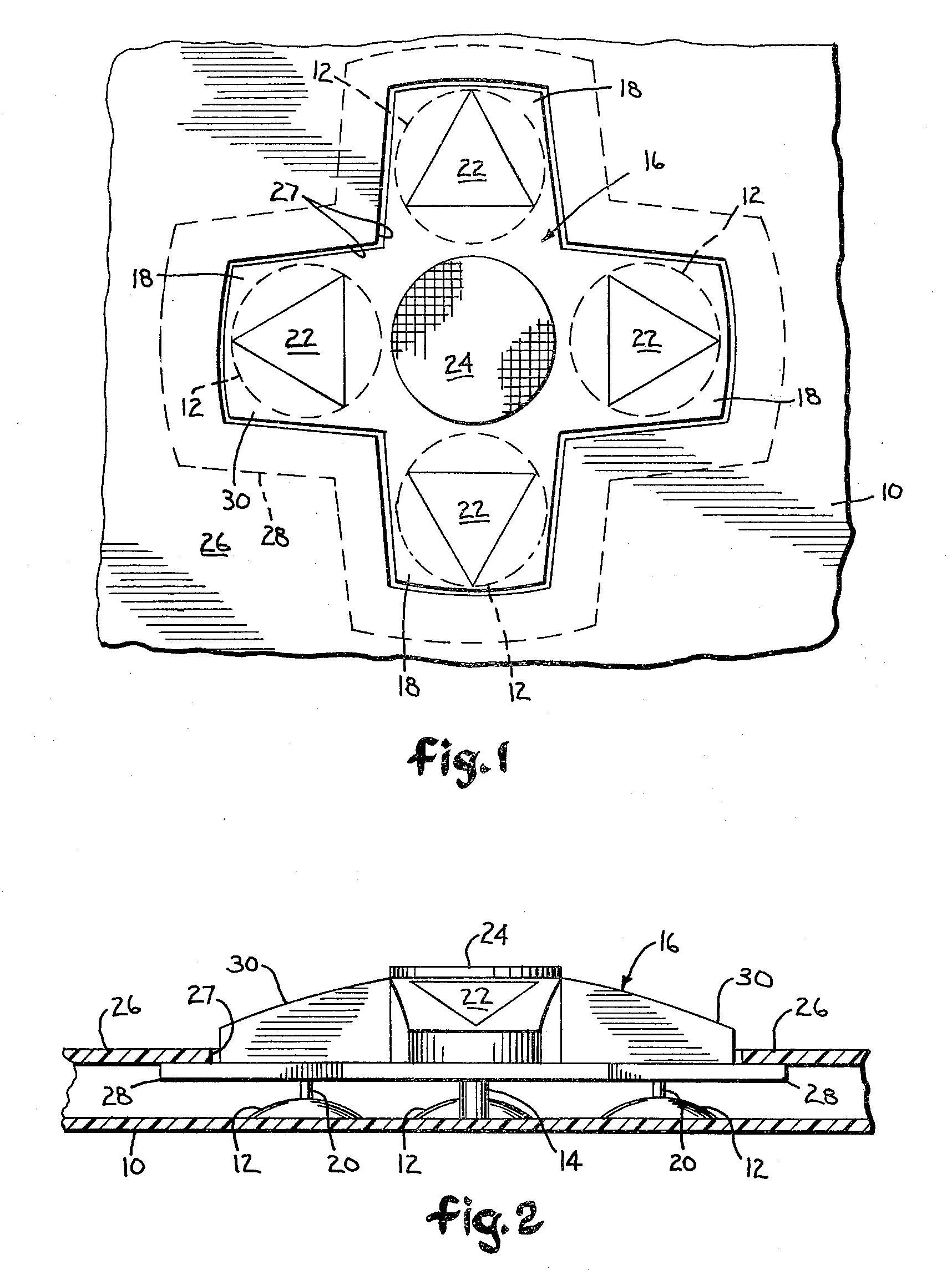
Palisek's D-pad patent drawing

In 1979, William F. Palisek patented the first true D-pad design for Tiger Electronics. His version featured a single piece of plastic resting on a central pivot and four directional switches that provide input and keep the plastic pad resting in a neutral position when not in use. Tiger debuted the design on its Deluxe Football with Instant Replay handheld in 1980, marketing it as the "Playmaker" button. Media reviews praised it for enabling "one-button control". That same year, Mattel released the Intellivision, featuring a smooth freely rotating circular pad that registered presses in up to 16 directions. Internally, a metal spring holds the Intellivision's control disc centered above sheets of printed mylar.

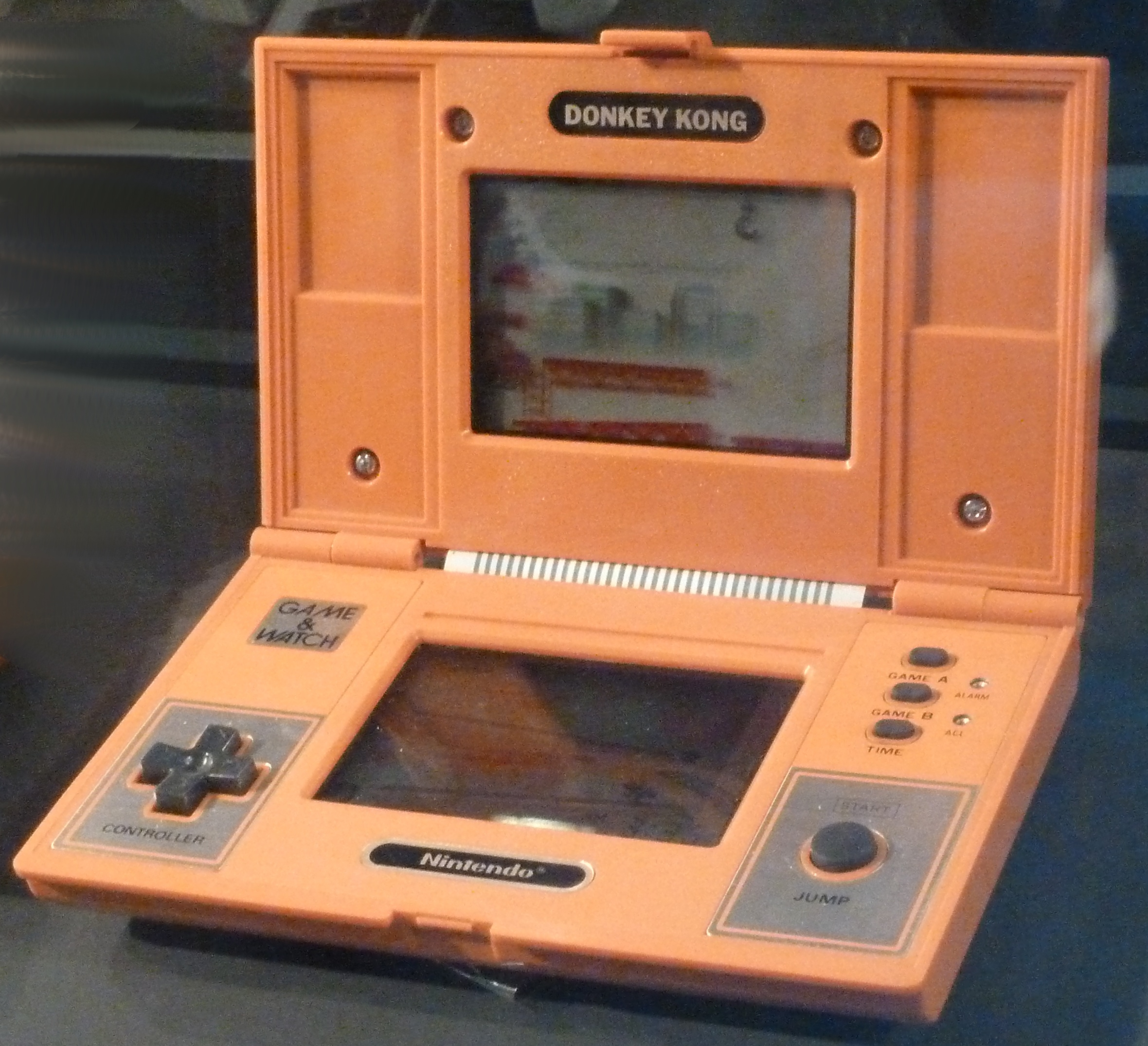
Donkey Kong (1982) Game & Watch adaptation with the familiar cross-shaped D-pad

Nintendo's iconic "cross" design was developed by Ichiro Shirai and first used the 1982 Game & Watch handheld adaptation of the Donkey Kong arcade game. Unlike Palisek's earlier design, which was larger, centrally located on the device and used domed switches, Nintendo's version was smaller, positioned for the left thumb, and employed membrane switches that were easier to depress; this key innovation became the distinguishing feature of Nintendo's patented design. The compact design gained popularity on subsequent Game & Watch titles. The design later earned a Technology & Engineering Emmy Award.

Initially created as a space-saving control method for handheld devices, Nintendo soon recognized the D-pad's potential for home consoles and made it the standard directional input for the highly successful Nintendo Entertainment System (first released in 1983 in Japan as the Famicom) under the name "+Control Pad" (which is Nintendo's official term for this input method on its controllers). Part of Nintendo's rationale came from the durability of the D-pad and the expectation that controllers would be left on floors and crushed. Since then, nearly all major video game consoles have included some form of D-pad on their controllers. To avoid infringing on Nintendo's patent, most third-party manufacturers adopted variations, typically featuring a cross embedded within a circular base.

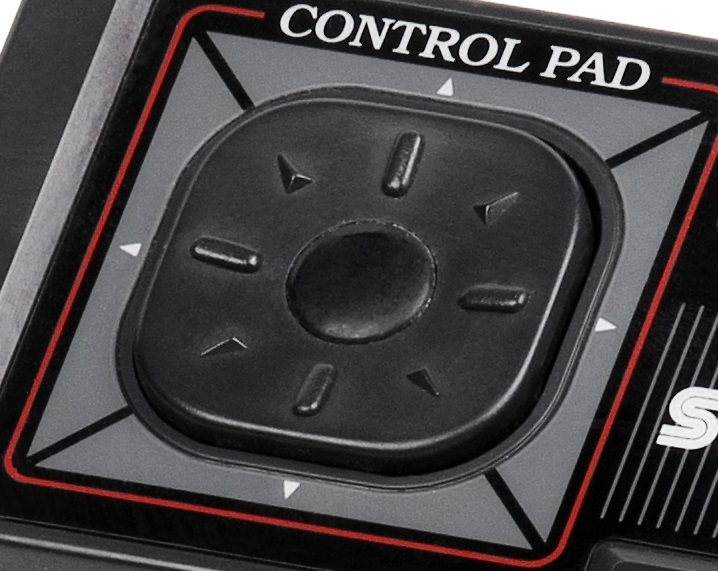
Master System D-pad providing eight-directional buttons

In 1984, the Japanese company Epoch created a handheld game system called the Epoch Game Pocket Computer. It featured a D-pad, but it was not popular for its time and soon faded. Following the release of the Sega Mega Drive in 1988, Sega coined the term "D button" to describe the pad, using the term when describing the controllers for the Sega Genesis in instruction manuals and other literature. Arcade games, however, have largely continued using joysticks.

Modern consoles, beginning with the Nintendo 64, provide both a D-pad and a compact thumb-operated analog stick; depending on the game, one type of control may be more appropriate than the other. In many cases with games that use a thumbstick, the D-pad is used as a set of extra buttons, all four usually centered on a kind of task, such as using items. Even without an analog stick, some software uses the D-pad's 8-directional capabilities to act as eight discrete buttons, not related to direction or on-screen movement at all. Jam Sessions for the Nintendo DS, for example, uses the D-pad to select music chords during play.

== Components ==
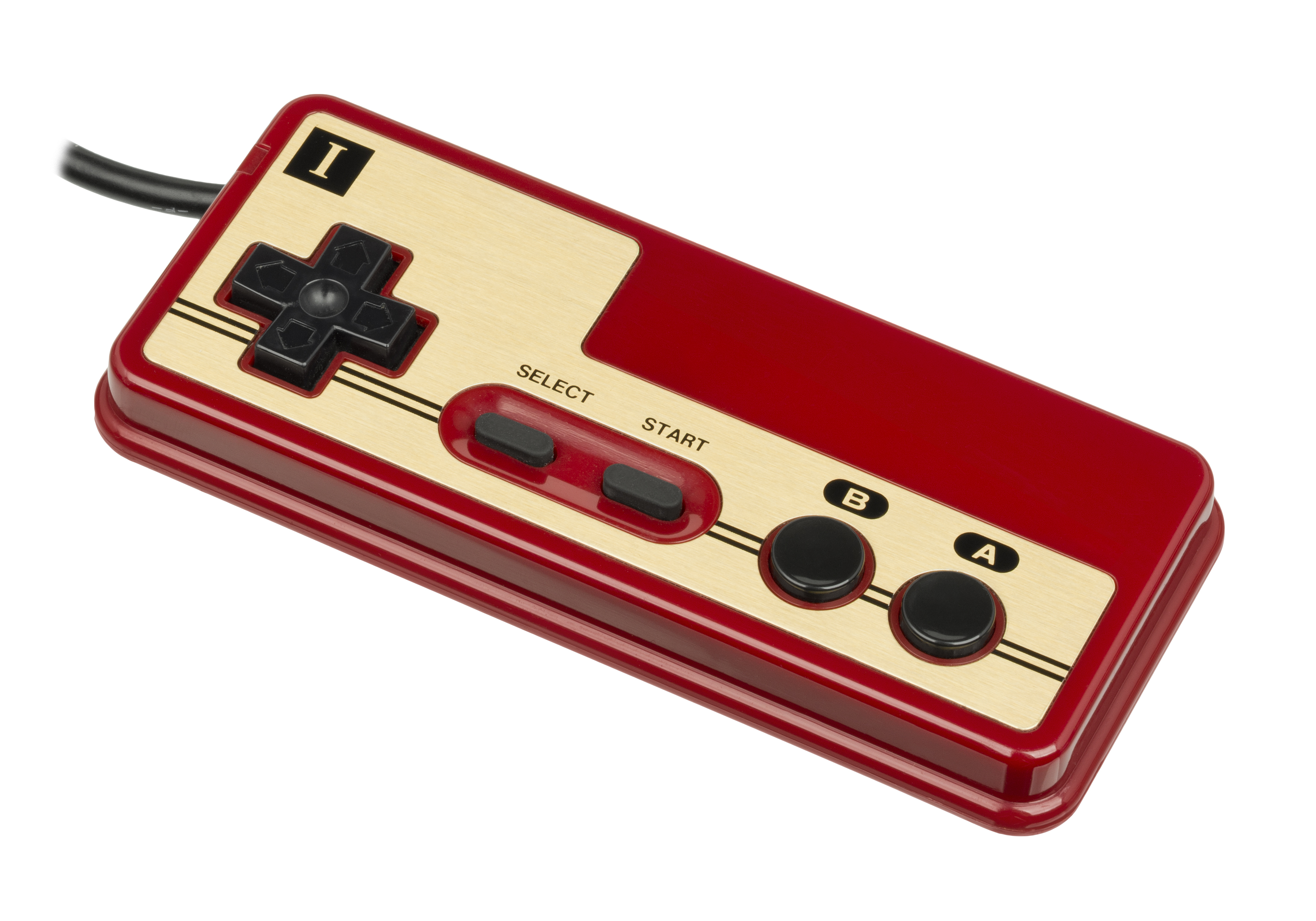
A Famicom controller. The D-pad/+Control Pad (cross shape on left) first came to prominence on the controller for the Famicom.

D-pads vary in design but generally have a:

- Circuit board that registers input
- Membrane that is pressed down against the board to complete the circuit
- Hard pivot in the center
- Plastic D-pad "button"

The housing of the controller or other device holds these components together. The central pivot keeps all four directions from being pressed at once and causes the D-pad to tilt into the direction pressed. Outside of gaming, D-pads are used for menu navigation and may lack the central pivot. Some remotes instead have a central "select" or "OK" button. With the increased usage of touchscreens, some applications offer virtual D-pads.

== On non-gaming equipment ==
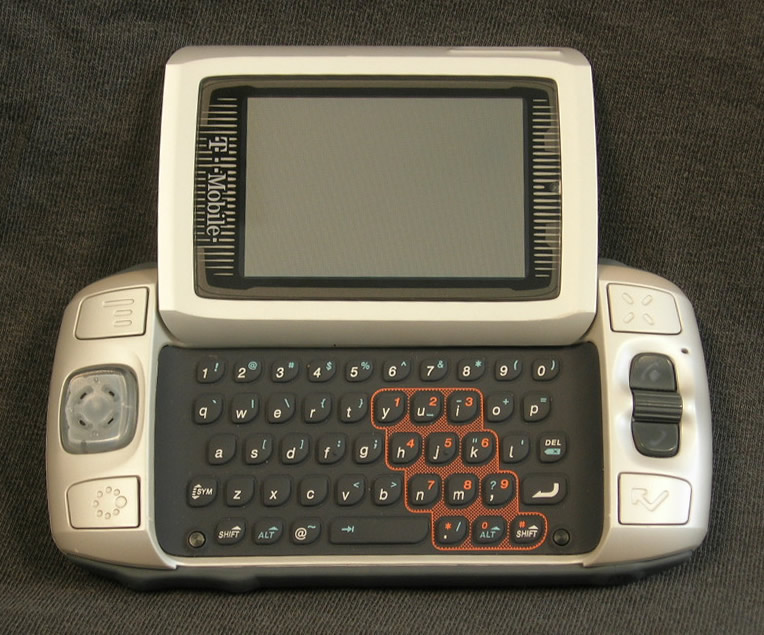
T-Mobile Sidekick with a D-pad to left of the keyboard

D-pads appear on a number of menu-driven devices as a simple navigational tool; though superficially similar to those used for gaming devices, they are not optimized for real-time control and therefore can usually accept input from only one direction at a time. Many, though not all, such designs include a trigger button in the center of the button arrangement, usually labeled "Enter", "OK", or the like. Some older devices do not have D-pads as such, but simple single-axis, up/down or left/right pads. On some remotes, the D-pad can also be used to control a robot using a signal-compatible receiver.

On remote control devices, the buttons on the D-pad function in the same manner as other buttons, and are generally used to navigate on-screen menus. Though initially not common, the quick success of the DVD format led to wide availability of remote designs with D-pads circa 2000, and most current menu-driven consumer electronics devices include some sort of D-pad on the remote (and, occasionally, on the unit itself).

In addition, many small computing and communications devices, particularly PDAs, mobile phones, and GPS receivers, include D-pads not only for menu navigation but as general input devices similar to a joystick or mouse. Less-sophisticated designs similar to those on remote controls appear on some calculators, particularly scientific and graphing calculators, which use the D-pad for cursor control on multi-line screens, as well as input/output recall, menu navigation, and occasionally direct screen access (graphing calculators in particular allow the use of the D-pad to determine values at specific points on a displayed graph). On programmable units, the D-pad can also be mapped directly, allowing it to be used as a gaming or pointer control.

== Consoles with D-pads ==
=== Consoles with separate controllers ===
- 1983 – Famicom/NES (Note: Officially referred to as the +Control Pad.)
- 1984 – SC-3000/SG-1000 (optional SJ-150 Joypad)
- 1984 – SG-1000 II
- 1984 – Atari 7800 (CX-78 controller)
- 1985 – Mark III/Master System
- 1987 – PC Engine/TurboGrafx-16
- 1988 – Mega Drive/Genesis
- 1990 – Super Famicom/Super NES
- 1990 – Philips CD-i
- 1993 – 3DO Interactive Multiplayer
- 1993 – Amiga CD32
- 1993 – Atari Jaguar
- 1994 – Sega Saturn
- 1994 – PlayStation (Note: Officially referred to as the directional buttons.)
- 1994 – PC-FX
- 1995 – Virtual Boy (two D-pads)
- 1995 – Pippin
- 1996 – Nintendo 64
- 1998 – Dreamcast
- 2000 – PlayStation 2
- 2001 – Nintendo GameCube
- 2001 – Xbox
- 2005 – Xbox 360
- 2006 – PlayStation 3
- 2006 – Wii
- 2012 – Wii U
- 2013 – Ouya
- 2013 – PlayStation 4
- 2013 – Xbox One
- 2013 – Gamestick
- 2015 – Shield Android TV
- 2017 – Nintendo Switch (Pro Controller and Nintendo Switch Lite only)
- 2020 – PlayStation 5
- 2020 – Xbox Series X/S
- 2021 – Atari VCS (2021 console)
- 2025 – Nintendo Switch 2 (Pro Controller only)

=== Handheld consoles ===
- 1980 – Tiger Electronics (Playmaker)
- 1981 – Tomytronic (Tron)
- 1982 – Game & Watch (Donkey Kong)
- 1984 – Epoch Game Pocket Computer
- 1989 – Game Boy line
- 1989 – Atari Lynx
- 1990 – Game Gear
- 1994 – Mega Jet
- 1995 – Genesis Nomad
- 1998 – PocketStation
- 2001 – GP32
- 2003 – Leapster
- 2004 – Nintendo DS
- 2004 – PlayStation Portable
- 2006 – Nintendo DS Lite
- 2008 – GP2X F200
- 2009 – Mi2
- 2009 – Nintendo DSi
- 2009 – GP2X Wiz
- 2009 – PSP Go
- 2010 – Nintendo DSi XL
- 2011 – Pandora
- 2011 – Nintendo 3DS
- 2011 – PlayStation Vita
- 2013 – Nintendo 2DS
- 2013 – Nvidia Shield
- 2014 – New Nintendo 3DS
- 2017 – New Nintendo 2DS XL
- 2019 – Nintendo Switch Lite
- 2022 – Steam Deck
- 2022 – Panic Playdate

== See also ==
- Analog stick
- Arrow keys
- Joystick (Hat switch)
