= Romtec Colorvision =

Handheld game console

Colorvision
- Manufacturer: Romtec
- Type: Handheld game console
- Generation: Second generation
- Released: 1984
- Display: Color LCD
- Sound: Internal speaker
- Input: Action button, HR/CLR and ACL buttons, Joystick
- Power: 2 x C batteries

The Colorvision is a handheld video game console developed and manufactured by Hong Kong–based company Romtec Enterprises, Ltd., released in Hong Kong and Europe in 1984.

It is the first handheld video game console to have colored sprites on a LCD screen instead of overlays or VFD displays. Previous systems like The Entex Select-A-Game had games that came with overlays to enhance the graphics and play experience, while only the cartridge is needed on the Colorvision.

It was manufactured and released by Romtec, but the console was also distributed under several brands, including Altic, Bazin and Bristol.

== Hardware ==
The game code was all contained in the console, meaning that the cartridges functioned similar to the jumper cards on the Magnavox Odyssey to control which game would be played, and only contained the LCD portion of the game with the sprites. The LCD was clear, and the plastic shell contains a window to let light through.

The console contains the controls for the game, and the cartridge port on the top, where it slides into place, showing a bezel with the name of the game. The play screen is a mirror, similar to the Adventure Vision, that reflects the LCD image using the light that shines from the window on top.

== Games ==
Only five games are known to have been released for the system.

Since the cartridge didn't contain the actual games, only the graphics, it is not known if other games were programmed inside of the console for future releases, or if only the five were planned.

The names of the games on the cartridges came both in English and French:

- Beasts Planet / Planete des Bêtes)
- Horror House/ Salle Des Horreurs)
- Jungle Boy / Fils de la Jungle)
- Monster Chase / Chasse Aux Monstres)
- Submarine / Bataille Navale)
