= Colorvision =

Colorvision may refer to:

- Color vision, the ability of an organism or machine to distinguish objects based on the wavelengths (or frequencies) of the light they reflect, emit, or transmit.
- Color Visión, a television network based in the Dominican Republic
- Romtec Colorvision, an tabletop/handheld video game console from 1984
- Colour Vision, a 2020 album by Max Schneider
