= Bit Museum =

- Also known as: Bit Museum
- Genre: Documentary
- Created by: Jason Cirillo
- Developed by: Heavybag Media
- Directed by: Dennis Peters
- Presented by: Robotube Games
- Starring: Jason Cirillo
- Opening theme: "Bit Museum Theme"
- Composer: Zack Weisinger
- Country of origin: United States
- Original language: English
- No. of seasons: 1
- No. of episodes: 5

Production
- Executive producer: Dennis Peters
- Producer: Jason Cirilo
- Production locations: New Haven, Connecticut, Los Angeles, California
- Editor: Scott Amore
- Camera setup: Bob Sachetti
- Running time: Varies, usually 6-10 min per episode

Original release
- Network: YouTube; Vimeo; Destructoid.com; Robotube Games
- Release: January 2009 – present

Related
- Peek Poke

Bit Museum is a web series focusing on the topic of obsolete, antiquated, obscure, foreign, and otherwise relatively unknown or poorly documented video game hardware. Opinionated reviews and ratings of video game hardware or titles are generally avoided.

The show is not released on a regular schedule, with new episodes being released, on average, once every 1.5 months.

The host, Jason Cirillo, is an independent designer for Robotube Games, and appears in each episode. The setting of the show is usually said to be "the offices of Robotube Games" with each show opening in front of a flatscreen television displaying the Bit Museum logo.

Earlier episodes opened with a tinny-sounding 8-bit filtered rendition of pianist George Shearing's I'm Getting Sentimental Over You, hastily created in order to launch the show quickly, but starting from episode 4 a new vocalized theme song has been used. The song, composed by guitarist Zack Weisinger, features 8-bit sounding electronic music featuring the simplistic lyrics:

We are learning so much about all this cool stuff, I cannot wait for the show.

== History ==
The show's first episode features a detailed history of video game hardware made by Nintendo in the 1970s, and released only in Japan. The consoles "Racing 112" and "Block Kuzushi" are both displayed and demonstrated, with a Nintendo Famicom and Famicom Disk System shown, but not demonstrated.

The show opens immediately with an outtake which was intentionally left into the final edit. As Cirillo introduces the show, someone in an office chair rolls by in the background at a high speed, prompting laughter and a camera cut.

The show's tone is comedic with the occasional insertion of visual gags, juvenile humor, and frequent camera jump cuts.

On occasion, characters make appearances in the show to add humor, such as a shouting, fake-bearded Billy Mays parody in Bit Museum #3: The Wizard of Odyssey, and the "Official Bit Museum Handler" who was "summoned" to bring out the show's subject matter in Bit Museum #4: The Smoke and Mirrors of Entex Adventure Vision. These characters are both portrayed by Ed Wilson.

Bit Museum usually features 2-3 pieces of antiquated video game hardware per episode. Detailed inspection of features, physical build, game play, history and facts about inventors, historical sales numbers, and production notes are staples of each episode.

Certain pieces of hardware featured on Bit Museum are considered to be extremely rare amongst game collectors, such as the Entex Adventure Vision, which is featured in Episode #4.

== Popularity ==
Bit Museum is regularly featured on Destructoid.com upon release, with syndication to Vimeo and YouTube. The show has also appeared on various video game related blogs.

Bit Museum is also syndicated in the Apple Inc. iTunes Store as a free Podcast subscription.

Fan comments and feedback has been generally positive and enthusiastic, though writer Joseph Leray of Destructoid.com voiced criticism of episode 3, stating it "features a sort of faux-ad for cartridges with handles that falls a little flat".

On July 9, 2009, Bit Museum won the Documentary Category in the NATPE NextTV Competition at the LATV Fest. Neither Cirillo nor director Dennis Peters were in attendance at the event, hosted by Chris Hardwick of G4's Web Soup, and the award was subsequently accepted on their behalf by Jackie Peters of Heavybag Media.

== Show ==
=== Episodes ===
1. Nintendo's Early & Obscure Consoles
2. TV-Less Gaming in the Early 1980s
3. The Wizard of Odyssey
4. The Smoke and Mirrors of Entex AdventureVision
5. Nintendo Game & Watch History
6. TV Jackin' at Hard Off

=== Location ===
The first five episodes of Bit Museum are filmed in an office setting with each episode taking place in various locations therein. Cirillo jokingly comments in the opening of Episode #2 that they are in "the Robotube Games studios, right here in downtown, picturesque New Haven, Connecticut, the hub of game development of the world."

Aside from Robotube Games, there are no other game development studios in New Haven.

According to Jason Cirillo's blog, the New Haven office was closed in February 2009 and moved to Los Angeles, California, and future episodes are being filmed there.

== See also ==
- The Angry Video Game Nerd
