= Second generation of video game consoles =

Gaming generation from 1976 to 1992

In the history of video games, the second-generation era refers to computer and video games, video game consoles, and handheld video game consoles available from 1976 to 1992. Notable platforms of the second generation include the Fairchild Channel F, Atari 2600, Intellivision, Odyssey 2, and ColecoVision. The generation began in November 1976 with the release of the Fairchild Channel F. This was followed by the Atari 2600 in 1977, Magnavox Odyssey² in 1978, Intellivision in 1979 and then the Emerson Arcadia 2001, ColecoVision, Atari 5200, and Vectrex, all in 1982. By the end of the era, there were over 15 different consoles. It coincided with, and was partly fueled by, the golden age of arcade video games. The generation also included the entry of handheld consoles, chiefly led by Nintendo’s foray into gaming led by the Blue Ocean philosophy of Gunpei Yokoi and the release of the Game & Watch in 1980. This peak era of popularity and innovation for the medium resulted in many games for second generation home consoles being ports of arcade games. Space Invaders, the first "killer app" arcade game to be ported, was released in 1980 for the Atari 2600, though earlier Atari-published arcade games were ported to the 2600 previously. Coleco packaged Nintendo's Donkey Kong with the ColecoVision when it was released in August 1982.

Built-in games, like those from the first generation, saw limited use during this era. Though the first generation Magnavox Odyssey had put games on cartridge-like circuit cards, the games had limited functionality and required TV screen overlays and other accessories to be fully functional. More advanced cartridges, which contained the entire game experience, were developed for the Fairchild Channel F, and most video game systems adopted similar technology. The first system of the generation and some others, such as the RCA Studio II, still came with built-in games while also being able to use cartridges. The popularity of game cartridges grew after the release of the Atari 2600. From the late 1970s to the mid-1990s, most home video game systems used cartridges until the technology was replaced by optical discs. The Fairchild Channel F was also the first console to use a microprocessor, which was the driving technology that allowed the consoles to use cartridges. Other technology such as screen resolution, color graphics, audio, and AI simulation was also improved during this era. The generation also saw the first handheld game cartridge system, the Microvision, which was released by toy company Milton Bradley in 1979.

In 1979, Activision was created by former Atari programmers and was the first third-party developer of video games. A small company through the 1980s, it gradually grew into a 21st-century gaming giant. In the early 1980s, many large corporations, spurred by the success of the home video game industry and especially the VCS, launched or bought subsidiaries to produce video game console software. By 1982, the shelf capacity of toy stores was overflowing with an overabundance of consoles, over-hyped game releases, and low-quality games from new third-party developers. An over-saturation of consoles and games, coupled with poor knowledge of the market, saw the video game industry crash in 1983 and marked the start of the next generation. Beginning in December 1982 and stretching through all of 1984, the crash of 1983 caused major disruption to the North American market. Some developers collapsed and the development of new console games slowed. By mid 1985, the amount of console games announced for release in the US was effectively zero. The market did not fully recover until the third generation. The second generation ended in 1992, with the discontinuation of the Atari 2600.

== Background ==
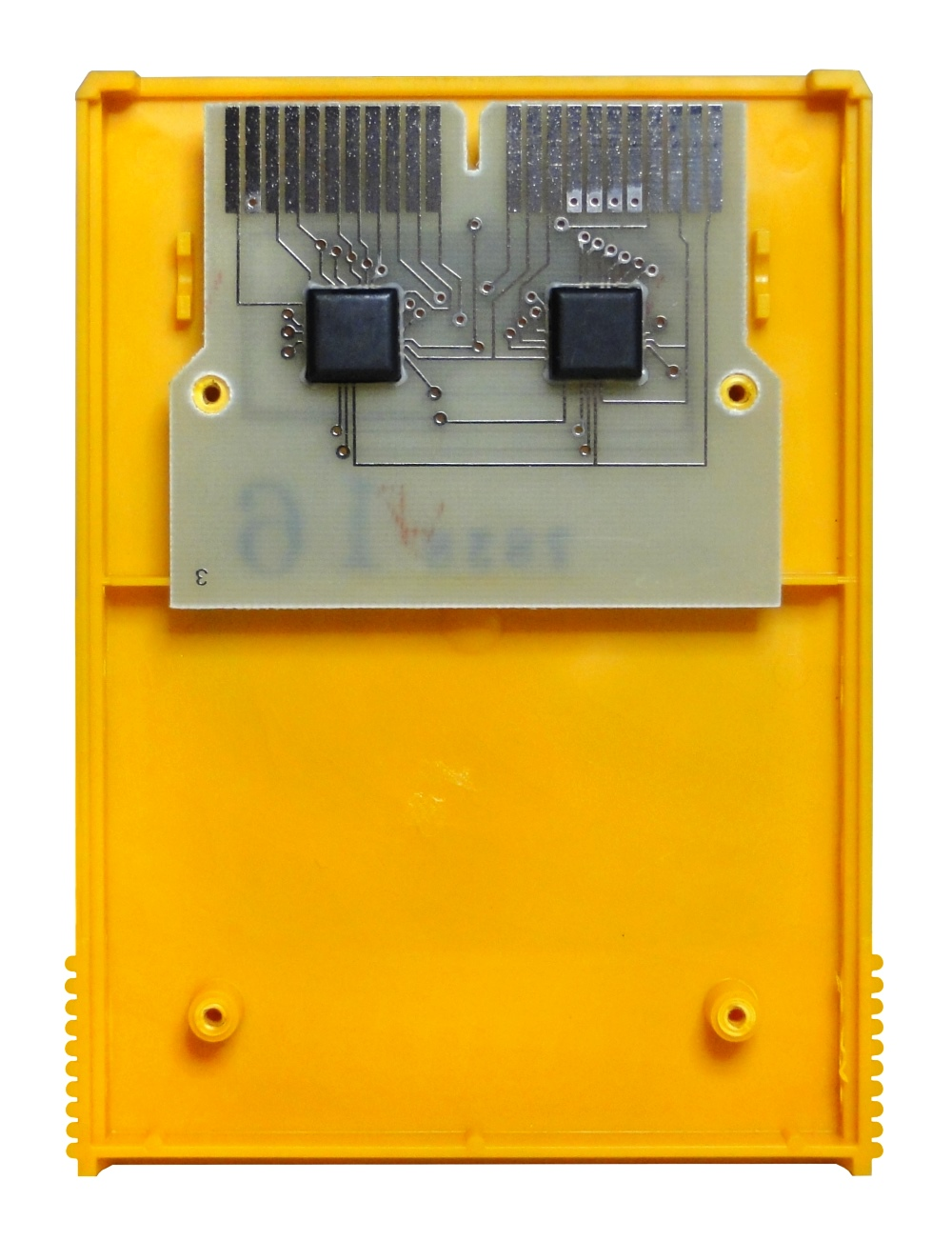
An opened Fairchild Channel F ROM cartridge, illustrating the ROM chips mounted to a circuit board within the casing. The cartridges were inserted into the console via the exposed contacts on the top of the board.

The primary driver of the second generation of consoles was the introduction of the low-cost microprocessor. Arcade games and the first generation of consoles used discrete electronic components including simple logic chips such as transistor-transistor logic (TTL)-based integrated circuits (ICs). Custom application-specific integrated circuits (ASICs) like the AY-3-8500 were produced to replicate these circuits within a single chip, but still presented only a single fixed logic program. Once a game was shipped, there were only minimal variations that could be made by adjusting the positions of jumpers (effectively the behavior of the "cartridges" that shipped with the Magnavox Odyssey). As Atari, Inc. recognized, spending from $100,000 to 250,000 and several months of development time on a hardware unit with a single dedicated game with only three-month shelf life before it was outdated by other competitors' offerings was not a practical business model, and instead some type of programmable console would be preferred.

Intel introduced the first microprocessor, the 4004, in 1971, a special computer chip that could be sent a simple instruction and provide its result. This allowed the ability to create software programs around the microprocessor rather than fix the logic into circuits and ICs. Engineers at both Atari, Inc. (via its Cyan Engineering subsidiary) and at Alpex Computer Corporation saw the potential to apply this to home consoles as prices for microprocessors became more affordable. Alpex's work led to partnership with semiconductor manufacturer Fairchild Camera and Instrument and lead to the release of the first such programmable home console, the Fairchild Channel F released in 1976, based on the Fairchild F8 microprocessor. The Channel F also established the use of ROM cartridges to provide the software for the programmable console, consisting of a ROM chip mounted on a circuit board within a hard casing that can withstand the physical insertion into the console and potential static electricity buildup. Atari's own programmable console, the Atari Video Computer System (Atari VCS or later known as the Atari 2600), was released in 1977 and based on the MOS Technology 6507 microprocessor, with a cartridge design influenced in part by the Channel F system. Other console manufacturers soon followed suit with the production of their own programmable consoles.

At the start of the second generation, all games were developed and produced in-house. Four former Atari programmers, having left from conflicts in management style after Atari was purchased by Warner Communications in 1976, established Activision in 1979 to develop their own VCS games, which included Dragster initially and the hits Kaboom! and Pitfall! later. Atari sued Activision and its founders on the basis of theft of trade secrets and violation of their non-disclosure agreements, and for Dragster allegedly infringing on the Drag Race arcade game from Atari's arm Kee Games; the cases were thrown out of court and the two companies settled in 1982, with Activision agreeing to pay Atari for a "technology license". This established Activision as the first third-party developer for a console. It also established a working model for other third-party developers, and several such companies followed in Activision's wake, partially contributing to the video game crash of 1983 due to oversaturation.

As the second generation of consoles coincided with the golden age of arcade video games, a common trend that emerged during the generation was licensing arcade video games for consoles. Many of them were increasingly licensed from Japanese video game companies by 1980, which led to Jonathan Greenberg of Forbes predicting in early 1981 that Japanese companies would eventually dominate the North American video game industry later in the decade.

At this stage, both consoles and game cartridges were intended to be sold for profit by manufacturers. However, by segregating games from the console, this approach established the use of the razorblade business model in future console generations, where consoles would be sold at or below cost while licensing fees from third-party games would bring in profits.

== Home consoles ==
=== Fairchild Channel F ===
The Fairchild Channel F, also known early in its life as the Fairchild Video Entertainment System (VES), was released by Fairchild Semiconductor in November 1976 and was the first console of the second generation. It was the world's first CPU-based video game console, introducing the cartridge-based game-code storage format. The console featured a pause button that allowed players to freeze a game. This allowed them to take a break without the need to reset or turn off the console so they did not lose their current game progress. Fairchild released twenty-six cartridges for the system, with up to four games being on each cartridge. The console came with two pre-installed games, Hockey and Tennis.

Following the release of the Atari 2600, the Channel F's popularity waned quickly as the more action-driven games of the Atari 2600 drew more attention than the more educational and slow-paced games on the Channel F. By 1979, only an additional 100,000 units of the Channel F were sold for lifetime sales of 350,000.

In 1978, Fairchild redesigned the system into a new model, the Channel F System II. The System II streamlined some of the initial Channel F to reduce cost and improve consumer usage compared to the Atari 2600, such as improved controller connections and using the television speakers for audio output, but by the time it was released, the Atari 2600 had too much market advantage for Fairchild to overcome. After releasing 21 games for the system, Fairchild sold the Channel F technology to Zircon International in 1979, who then discontinued the system by 1983.

=== Atari 2600 and 5200 ===
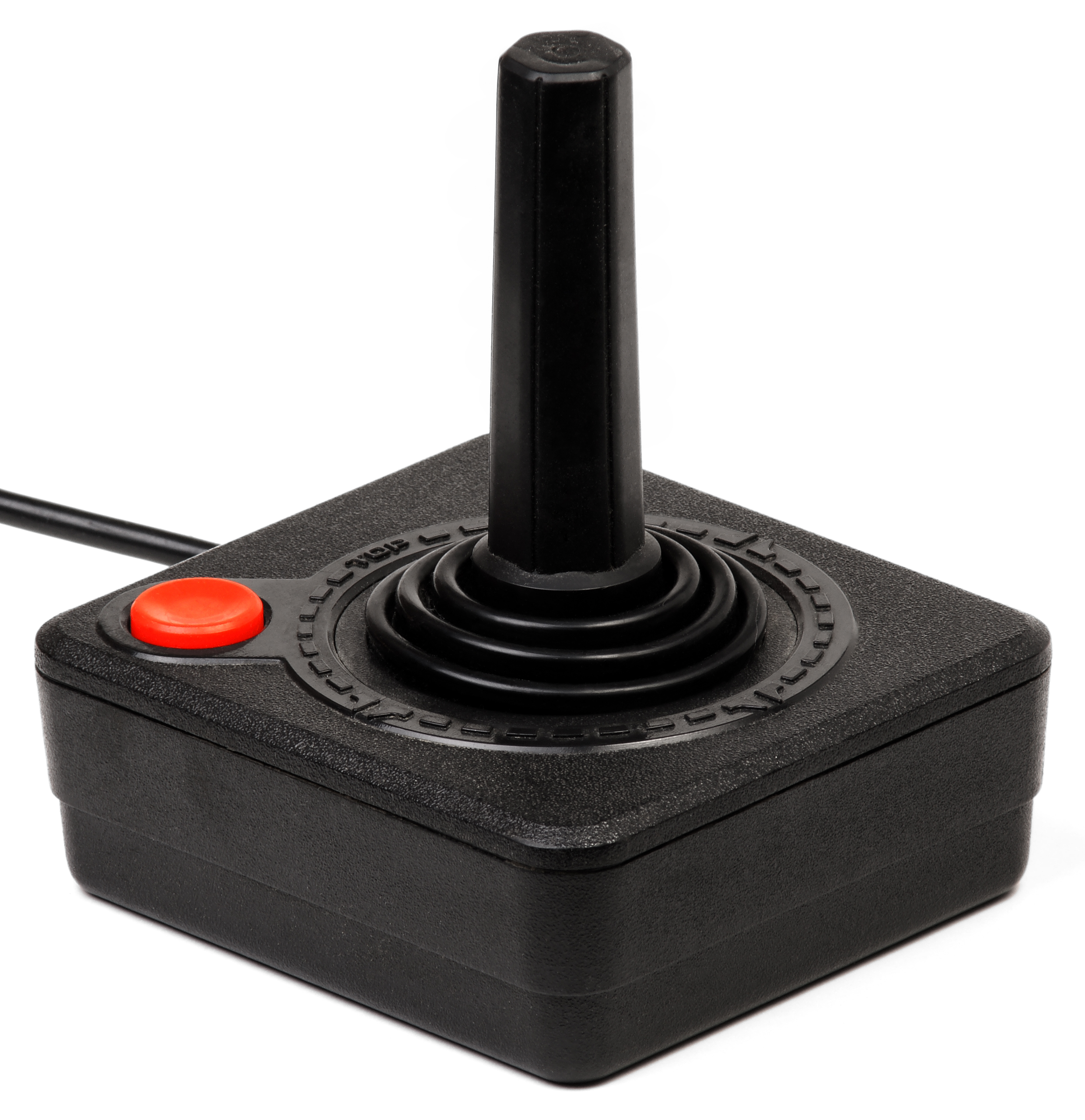
An Atari 2600 game joystick controller

In 1977, Atari released its CPU-based console called the Video Computer System (VCS), later called the Atari 2600. Nine games were designed and released for the holiday season. Atari held exclusive rights to most of the popular arcade game conversions of the day. They used this key segment to support their older hardware in the market. This game advantage and the difference in price between the machines meant that each year, Atari sold more units than Intellivision, lengthening its lead despite inferior graphics. The Atari 2600 sold over 30 million units over its lifetime, considerably more than any other console of the second generation. In 1982, Atari released the Atari 5200 in an attempt to compete with the Intellivision. While superior to the 2600, poor sales and lack of new games meant Atari only supported it for two years before it was discontinued.

Early Atari 2600 cartridges contained 2 kilobytes of read-only storage. This limit grew steadily from 1978 to 1983: up to 16 kilobytes for Atari 5200 cartridges. The Atari 2600 directly supports up to 4 kilobytes (4096 bytes) of cartridge ROM. Bank switching, a technique that allows two or more different parts of the program to use the same memory addresses, was required for the larger cartridges to work. The Atari 2600 cartridges got as large as 32 kilobytes through this technique. The Atari 2600 has only 128 bytes of RAM available in the console. A few late game cartridges contain a combined RAM/ROM chip, or an additional separate RAM chip, thus adding another 256 bytes or more (up to 2 kilobytes) of RAM inside the cartridge itself. The Atari 2600 standard joystick is a digital controller with a single button, released in 1977. The Atari 2600 also supports 4 analog paddle controllers (or, in theory, 2 analog joysticks).

=== Astrocade ===
The Astrocade was released in 1977 and was available only through mail order. It was originally developed by Dave Nutting Associates and manufactured by Bally Midway, first referred to as the Bally Home Library Computer. Delays in the production meant that none of the units shipped until 1978. By this time, the machine had been renamed the Bally Professional Arcade. In this form, it sold mostly at computer stores and had little retail exposure, unlike the Atari VCS. The rights to the console were sold to Astrovision in 1981. They re-released the unit with the BASIC cartridge included for free; this system was known as the Bally Computer System. When Astrovision changed their name to Astrocade in 1982 they also changed the name of the console to the Astrocade to follow suit. It sold under this name until the video game crash of 1983 when it was discontinued.

=== Magnavox Odyssey 2 ===
In 1978, Magnavox released its microprocessor-based console, the Odyssey 2, in the United States and Canada. It was distributed by Philips Electronics in the European market and was released as the Philips G7000. A defining feature of the system was the speech synthesis unit add-on which enhanced music, sound effects and speech capabilities. The Odyssey² was also known for its fusion of board and video games. Some titles came with a game board and pieces which players had to use in conjunction to play the game. Although the Odyssey² never became as popular as the Atari consoles, it sold 2 million units throughout its lifetime. This made it the third best selling console of the generation. It was discontinued in 1984.

=== Intellivision ===
The Intellivision was introduced by Mattel to test markets in 1979 and nationally in 1980. The Intellivision console contained a 16-bit processor with 16-bit registers and 16-bit system RAM. This was long before the "16-bit era". Programs were however stored on 10-bit ROM. It also featured an advanced sound chip that could deliver output through three distinct sound channels. The Intellivision was the first console with a thumb-pad directional controller and tile-based playfields with vertical and horizontal scrolling. The system's initial production run sold out shortly after its national launch in 1980. Early cartridges were 4 kilobyte ROMs, which grew to 24 kilobytes for later games.

The Intellivision introduced several new features to the second generation. It was the first home console to use a 16-bit microprocessor and offer downloadable content through the PlayCable service. It also provided real-time human voices during gameplay. It was the first console to pose a serious threat to Atari's dominance. A series of TV advertisements featuring George Plimpton were run. They used side-by-side game comparisons to show the improved graphics and sound compared with those of the Atari 2600. It sold over 3 million units before being discontinued in 1990.

=== ColecoVision ===
The ColecoVision was introduced by toy manufacturer Coleco in August 1982. It was more powerful than previous consoles, providing an experience that was closer to Arcades than what the 2600 could provide. The console launched with several arcade ports, including Sega's Zaxxon, and later saw third-party support from many developers such as Activision and even their competitor Atari. The ColecoVision is notable for its Atari 2600 expansion module, which enabled the console to play 2600 games, resulting in a lawsuit from Atari. The ColecoVision was a victim of the video game crash, ultimately being discontinued in 1985.

=== Vectrex ===
The Vectrex was released in 1982. It was unique among home systems of the time in featuring vector graphics and its own self-contained display (necessitated by the fact that a normal TV set cannot display vector graphics, since the TV is a raster display). At the time, many of the most popular arcade games, such as Asteroids, used vector displays. Through a licensing deal with Cinematronics, GCE was able to produce high-quality versions of arcade games such as Space Wars and Armor Attack. Despite a strong library of games and good reviews, the Vectrex was ultimately a commercial failure. It was on the market for less than two years.

=== Comparison ===
Comparison of second-generation video game home consoles
Name		Fairchild Channel F	Atari 2600	Astrocade	Magnavox Odyssey²	Intellivision
Manufacturer		Fairchild Semiconductor	Atari	Bally Technologies	Magnavox	Mattel
Image(s)						
Release date		USA: November 1976; JP: October 1977	USA: September 1977; EU: 1978; JP: May 1983	USA: 1978	EU: December 1978; USA: February 1979; JP: 1982; BR: 1983	USA: Test marketed in 1979. Official release in 1980; EU: 1982; JP: 1982
Launch price	US$	US$169.95 (equivalent to $960 in 2025)	US$199 (equivalent to $1,060 in 2025)	US$299 (equivalent to $1,590 in 2025)	US$200 (equivalent to $990 in 2025)	US$299 (equivalent to $1,170 in 2025)
Launch price	GBP	—N/a	£199 (equivalent to £1,090 in 2025)	—N/a	—N/a	£199 (equivalent to £710 in 2025)
Launch price	JP¥	—N/a	—N/a	—N/a	JP¥49,800 (equivalent to ¥82,600 in 2024)	¥49,800 (equivalent to ¥68,480 in 2024)
Media	Type	Cartridge	Cartridge (and Cassette via special 3rd party attachment)	Cartridge and cassette/Floppy, available with ZGRASS unit	Cartridge	Cartridge
Media	Regional lockout	Unrestricted	Unrestricted	Unrestricted	Unrestricted	Unrestricted
Media	Backward compatibility	—N/a	—N/a	—N/a	—N/a	Atari 2600 games through the System Changer module
Top-selling games		Videocart-17: Pinball Challenge	Pac-Man, 7 million (as of September 1, 2006)	Unknown	Unknown	Las Vegas Poker & Blackjack, 1.939 million Major League Baseball, 1.085 million (as of June 1983)
Accessories (retail)		Jet-Stick for Channel F II	Paddle controllers (bound pair); Driving controller; Keypad; Game Brain; Starpath Supercharger; GameLine	ZGRASS unit	The Voice; Chess Module	Keyboard Component (cancelled); PlayCable; Intellivoice; Entertainment Computer System; Music Synthesizer keyboard; System Changer (Play's Atari 2600 Games)
CPU		1.79 MHz (PAL 2.00 MHz) Fairchild F8	1.19 MHz MOS Technology 6507	1.789 MHz Zilog Z80	1.79 MHz Intel 8048 8-bit microcontroller	2 MHz General Instrument CP1610
Memory		64 bytes scratchpad in 3850 CPU; Video RAM 2 kB (2×128×64 bits)	128 bytes RAM within MOS Technology RIOT chip (additional RAM may be included in game cartridges)	Main RAM 4 kB (up to 64 kB with external modules in the expansion port)	CPU-internal RAM: 64 bytes Audio/video RAM: 128 bytes	352 x 16-bit system RAM 240 x 8-bit scratchpad RAM; 512 x 8-bit graphics pattern table RAM
Video	Resolution	circa 102×58	160×240+ (sprites); 40x240+ (playfield)	True: 160×102; Basic: 160×88; Expanded RAM: 320×204	160×200 (NTSC)	160x96 (20x12 tiles of 8x8 pixels)
Video	Palette	8 colors	128 colors (NTSC); 104 colors (PAL); 8 colors (SECAM)	32 colors (8 intensities)	16 colors (fixed); sprites use 8 colors	16 color
Video	Colors on Screen	8 simultaneous (maximum of 4 per pixel row)	128 simultaneous (2 sprite colors [1 color per sprite] and 2 background/ball colors per scanline)	True: 8 Basic: 2	Unknown	16 simultaneous
Video	Sprites	Only by software	per scanline: 2 8-pixel sprites, each with 1, 2, or 3 spaced copies and scaled by ×1, x2, or x4, in 8 predefined patterns; 2 missiles (variable width); 1 ball (variable width)	Unlimited (software controlled)	4 8×8 single-color user-defined sprites; 12 8×8 single-color characters; 64 shapes built into ROM BIOS; 4 quad characters; 9×8 background grid; dots, lines, or blocks	8 sprites, 8x16 half-pixels
Video	Other	—N/a	—N/a	—N/a	—N/a	Vertical and horizontal scrolling
Audio		Mono audio with: 500 Hz, 1 kHz, and 1.5 kHz tones (can be modulated quickly to produce different tones)	Mono audio with: two channel sound; 5-bit frequency divider and 4-bit audio control register; 4-bit volume control register per channel	Mono audio with: 3 voices; noise/vibrato effect	Mono audio with: 24-bit shift register, clockable at 2 frequencies; noise generator	Mono audio with: General Instrument AY-3-8914; three channel sound; one noise generator

Name		Emerson Arcadia 2001	ColecoVision	Atari 5200	Vectrex
Manufacturer		Emerson Radio Corporation	Coleco	Atari	General Consumer Electric and Milton Bradley
Image(s)					
Release date		USA: May 1982; JP: 1983	USA: August 1982; EU: 1982	USA: November 1982	USA: November 1982; EU: May 1983; JP: June 1983
Launch price	US$	US$200 (equivalent to $670 in 2025)	US$175 (equivalent to $580 in 2025)	US$270 (equivalent to $900 in 2025)	US$199 (equivalent to $660 in 2025)
Launch price	GBP	—N/a	—N/a	—N/a	£149 (equivalent to £510 in 2025)
Launch price	JP¥	JP¥19,800 (equivalent to ¥26,700 in 2024)	—N/a	—N/a	—N/a
Media	Type	Cartridge	Cartridge and Cassette, available with Expansion #3	Cartridge	Cartridge
Media	Regional lockout	Unrestricted	Unrestricted	Unrestricted	Unrestricted
Media	Backward compatibility	—N/a	Compatible with Atari 2600 Via Expansion #1	Atari 2600 games through the 2600 cartridge adapter	—N/a
Top-selling games		N/A	Donkey Kong (pack-in)	N/A	N/A
Accessories (retail)		N/A	Expansion #1; Expansion #2; Expansion #3; Roller Controller; Super Action Controller Set	Trak-Ball Controller; Atari 2600 adaptor	3-D Imager; Light Pen
CPU		3.58 MHz Signetics 2650 CPU	3.58 MHz Zilog Z80A	1.79 MHz Custom MOS 6502C	1.5 MHz Motorola 68A09
Memory		512 bytes RAM	Main RAM 1 kB; Video RAM 16 kB	Main RAM 16 kB DRAM	Main RAM 1 kB
Video	Resolution	128x208 / 128×104	256×192	80×192 (16 color); 160×192 (4 color); 320×192 (2 color)	
Video	Palette	16 colors	15 colors, 1 transparent	256 colors	2 (black and white)
Video	Colors on Screen		16 simultaneous (1 color per sprite)	16 simultaneous, Up to 256 (16 hues, 16 luma) on screen (16 per scanline) with display list interrupts	2 simultaneous (black and white)
Video	Sprites		32 sprites (4 per scanline), 8×8 or 8×16 pixels, integer zoom	8 single-color sprites, full height of display; 1/2/4x width scaling	
Video	Other		Tilemap playfield, 8×8 tiles	14 graphics modes (6 tilemap, 8 bitmap); Fine and coarse scrolling (vertical and horizontal)	Built in vector CRT
Audio		Mono audio with: Single Channel "Beeper"; Single Channel "Noise"	Mono audio with: 3 tone generators; 1 noise generator	Mono audio with: 4-channel sound	Mono audio (built-in speaker): 3 channel sound; noise generator

==== Sales standings ====
The best-selling console of the second generation was the Atari 2600 at 30 million units. As of 1990, the Intellivision had sold 3 million units. This is around 1 million higher than the Odyssey² and ColecoVision sales and eight times the number of purchases for the Fairchild Channel F, which was 350,000 units.

Console	Units sold worldwide
Atari 2600	30 million (as of 2004)
Intellivision	3.75 million (as of 2004)
ColecoVision	>2 million (as of 1983)
Magnavox Odyssey²	2 million (as of 2005)
Atari 5200	1 million (as of 1984)
Fairchild Channel F	350,000 (as of 1979)
Astrocade	Unknown
Emerson Arcadia 2001	Unknown
Vectrex	Unknown

=== Other consoles ===
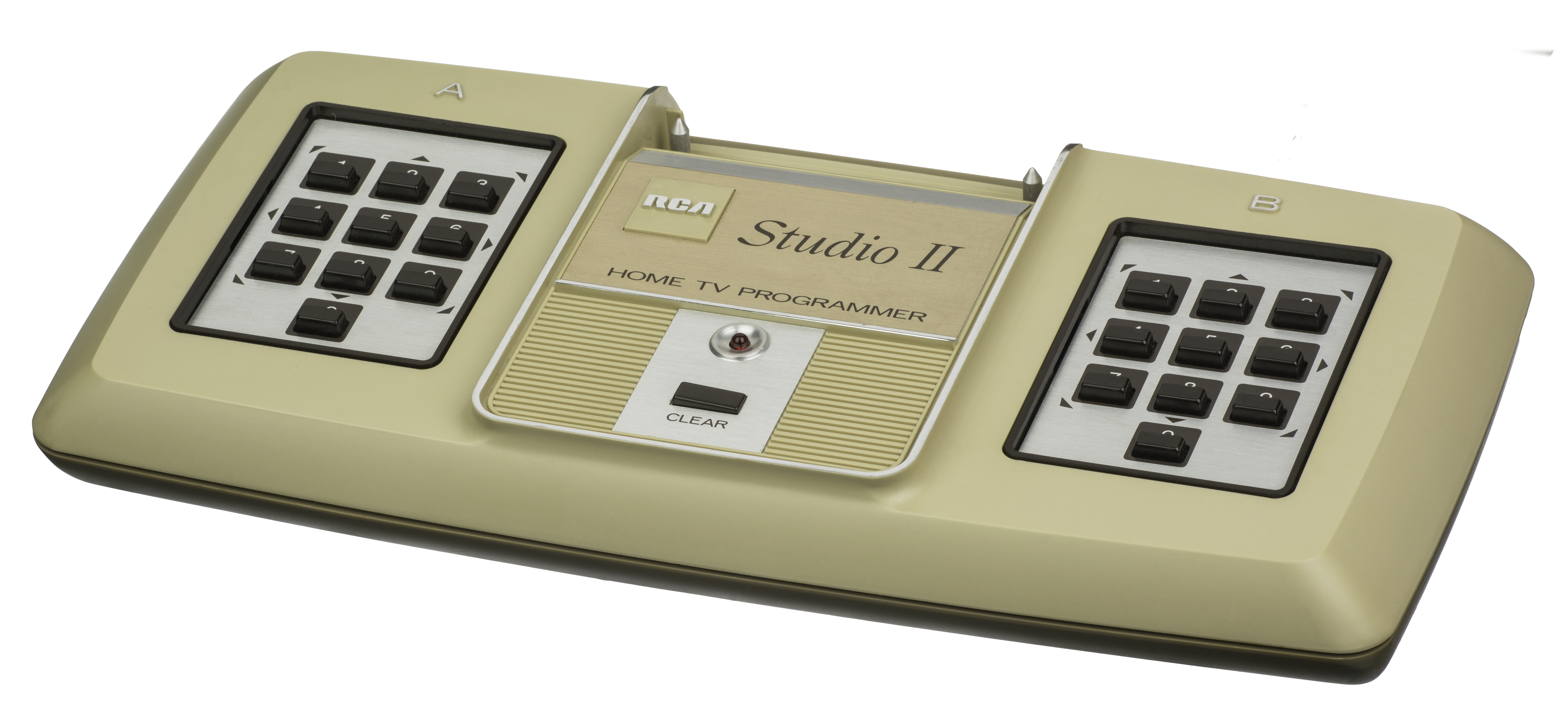
RCA Studio II
(released in 1977)

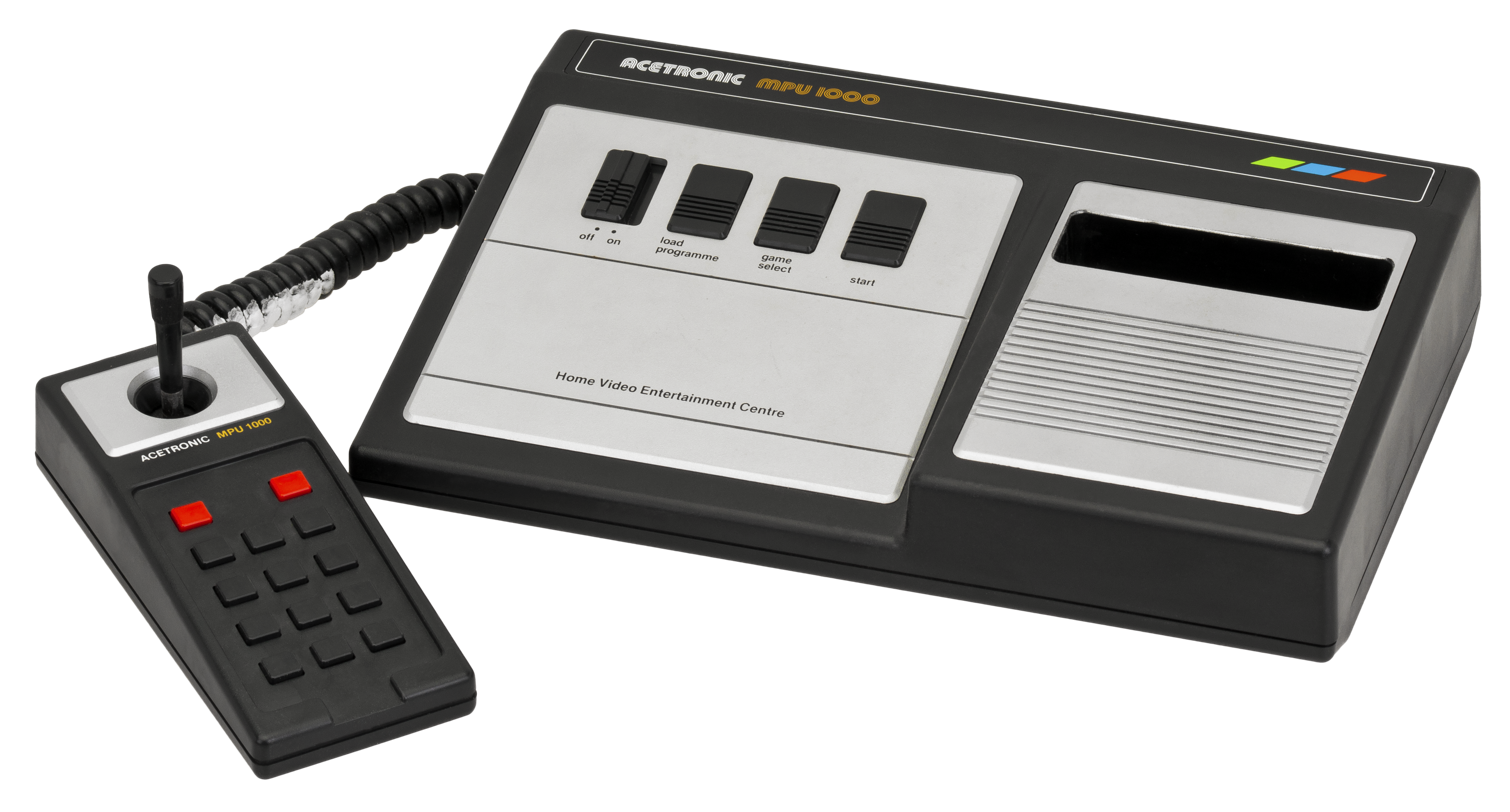
1292 Advanced Programmable Video System
(released in 1978)

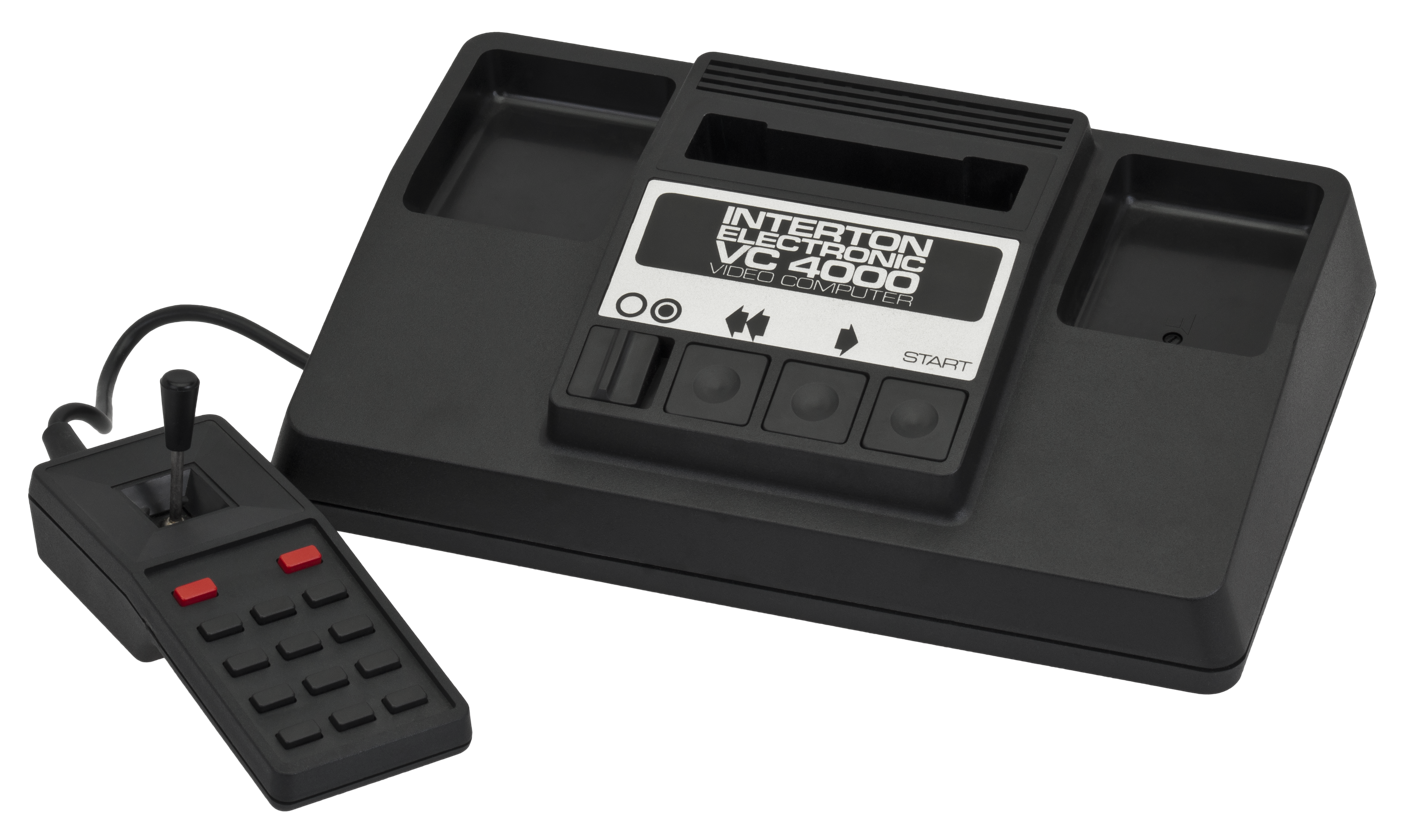
VC 4000
(released in 1978)

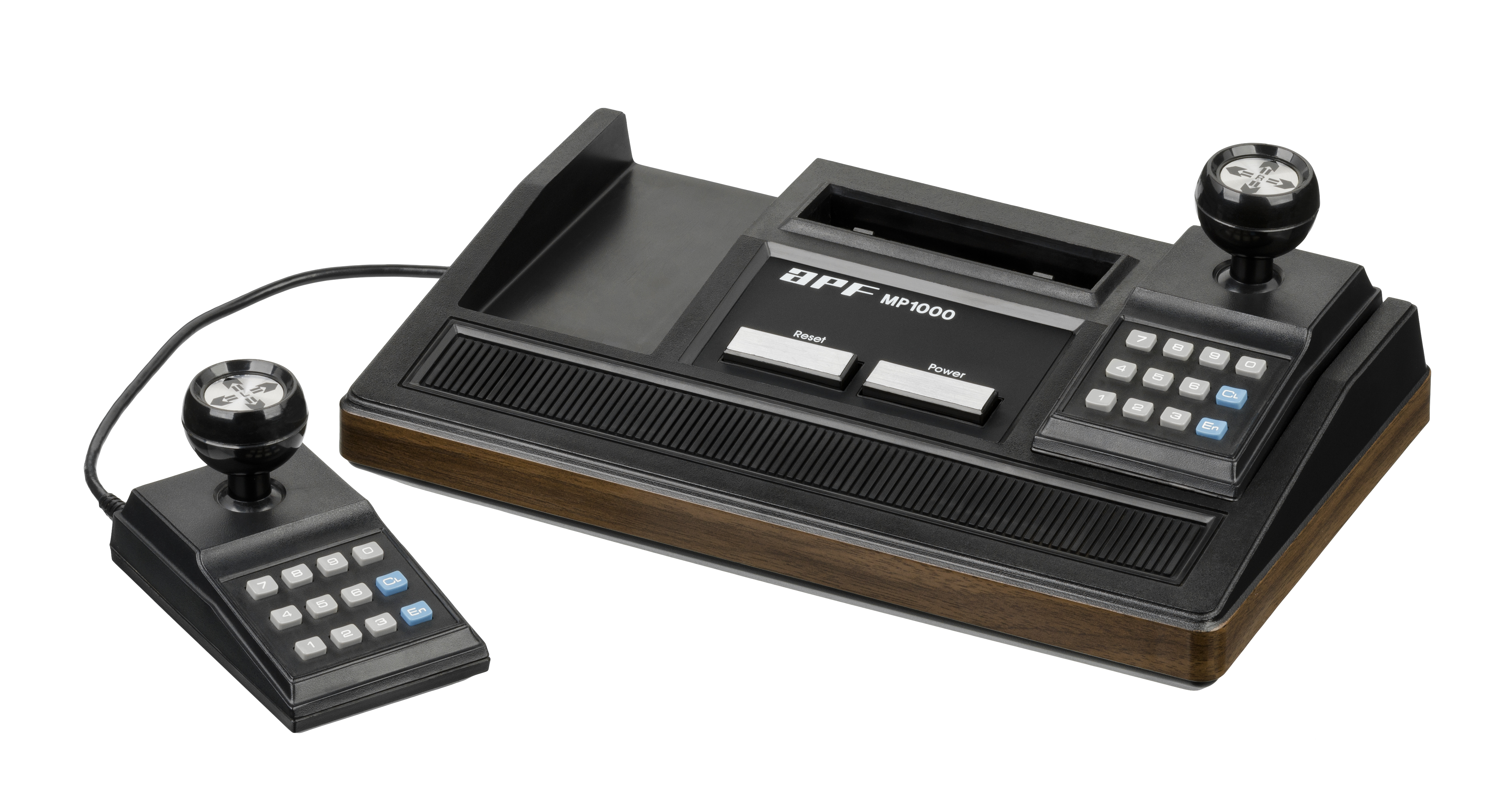
APF-MP1000
(released in 1978)

Unisonic Champion 2711
(released in 1978)

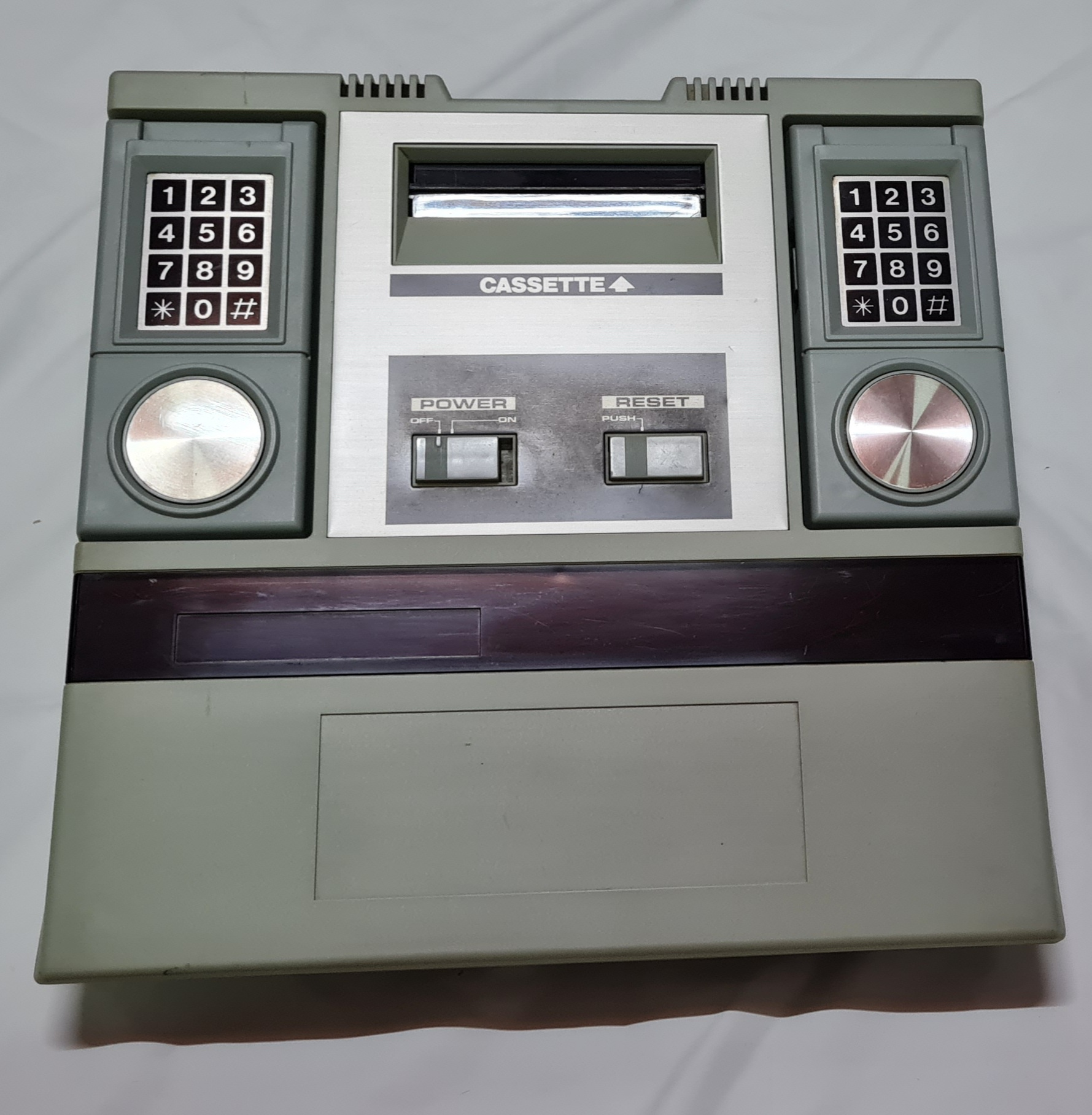
Bandai Super Vision 8000
(released in 1979)

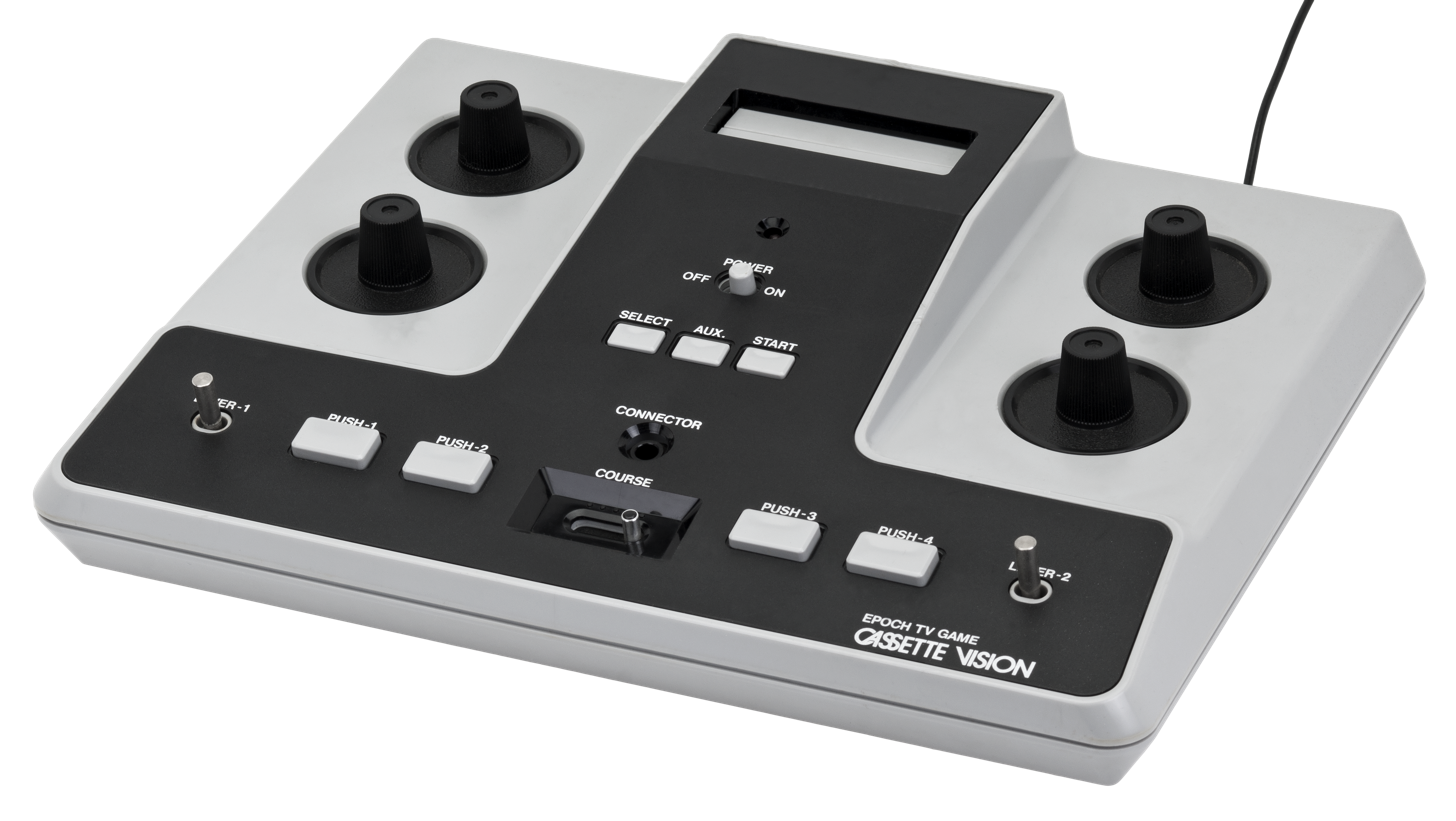
Epoch Cassette Vision
(released in 1981)

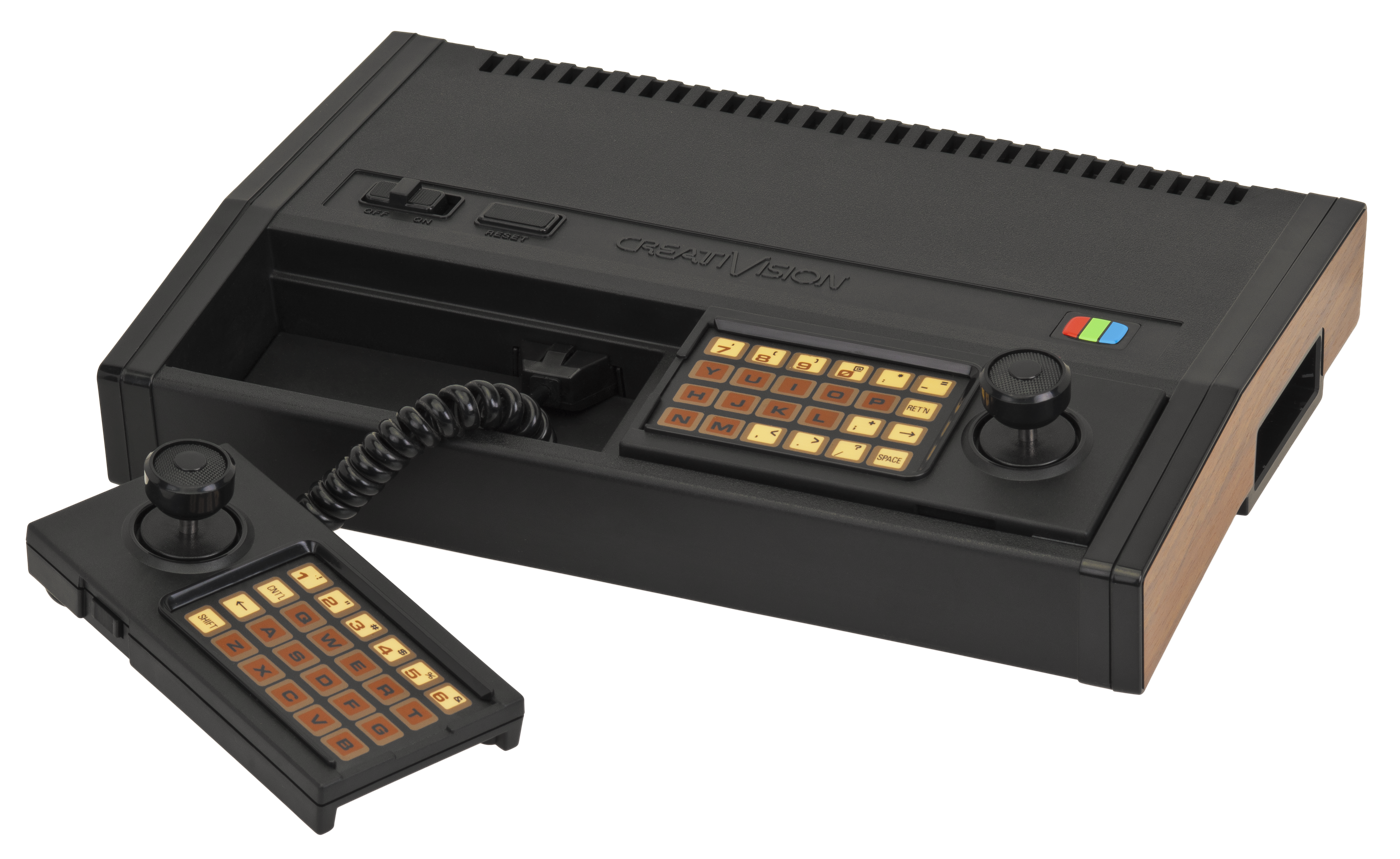
VTech CreatiVision
(released in 1981)

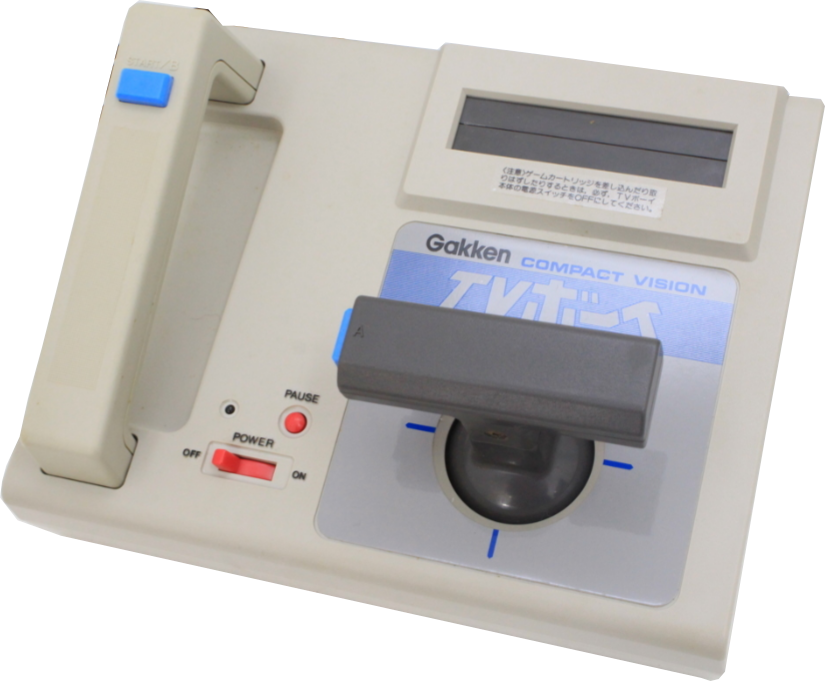
Compact Vision TV Boy (released in 1983)

== Handheld systems ==
=== Nintendo Game & Watch ===
The Game & Watch was a series of 60 handheld consoles that contained a single game in each release. The first, titled "Ball" was released in 1980 and titles were released up until it was discontinued in 1991. Unlike the other handheld consoles in the second generation, the Game & Watch had a segmented LCD screen similar to a digital watch which limited the display to the configuration of the segments. The series sold a combined 43.4 million units, making it the most popular handheld of the generation.

=== Microvision ===
The Microvision, manufactured and sold by Milton-Bradley. was released in 1979. It was the first handheld game console that used cartridges that could be swapped out and that contained their own processor as the console itself had no on-board processor. It had a small game library which was prone to damage from static electricity and the LCD screen could also rot. These two factors contributed to its discontinuation two years after release.

=== Entex Select-A-Game and Adventure Vision ===
Entex released two handheld systems in the second generation, the Select-A-Game and the Adventure Vision. There were 6 games available for the Select-A-Game but it was only available for a year until focus shifted to the Adventure Vision which was released in the following year.

The Adventure Vision was released only in North America in 1982 by Entex and was the successor to the Select-A-Game. It was unique among the consoles as it used a spinning mirror system for its built-in display and had to be used set down on a surface due to its size and shape. It was discontinued one year later in 1983 after selling just over fifty thousand units.

=== Palmtex Super Micro ===
Developed and manufactured by Palmtex, the Super Micro was released in 1984 and discontinued later that year. Due to financial problems between Palmtex and Home Computer Software, only three games were released for the system despite more being planned. It was criticized for its poor build quality and how easily it would break, and sold fewer than 37,000 units.

=== Epoch Game Pocket Computer ===
The Epoch Game Pocket Computer was released in Japan in 1984. Due to poor sales, only five games were made for it and was not released outside of Japan.

=== Comparison ===
Console	Microvision	Entex Select-A-Game	Adventure Vision
Manufacturer	Milton Bradley	Entex Industries	Entex Industries
Image			
Release date	November 1979	1981	1982
Launch price	US$49.99 (equivalent to $220 in 2025)	US$59 (equivalent to $210 in 2025)	US$79.99 (equivalent to $270 in 2025)
Units sold	Unknown	Unknown	50,757
Media	Cartridge	Cartridge	Cartridge
CPU	100 kHz TI TMS1100 or Intel 8021 within cartridge	Hitachi HD38800 within cartridge	733 kHz Intel 8048
Memory	64 B RAM		64 B RAM (on CPU) 1 KB (on main PCB)
Video	16 x 16 pixel LCD	7 x 16 pixel VFD 2 colors (red and blue)	150 x 40 pixel spinning mirror system Monochrome
Audio	Piezo Buzzer		National Semiconductor COP411L @ 52.6 kHz

Console	Super Micro	Epoch Game Pocket Computer	Game & Watch series
Manufacturer	Palmtex	Epoch	Nintendo
Image			
Release date	May 1984	November 1984	1980-1991
Launch price	US$39.95 (equivalent to $120 in 2025)	¥12,800 (equivalent to ¥16,890 in 2024)	¥5,800 (equivalent to ¥7,650 in 2024)
Units sold	Fewer than 37,200	Unknown	43.4 million
Media	Cartridge	Cartridge	1 built in game per device
Top-selling games	Unknown	Unknown	Donkey Kong (8 million)
CPU	None (CPU was contained within the cartridge)	6 MHz NEC D78c06	Sharp SM5xx series
Memory		2 KB RAM	260 B RAM
Video	32 x 16 pixel LCD 57.15 x 38.1mm	75 x 64 pixel LCD	Segmented LCD
Audio		Piezo Buzzer	

== Software ==
=== Milestone titles ===
- Advanced Dungeons and Dragons: Cloudy Mountain (Intellivision) by Mattel Electronics won an award in the "1984 Best Adventure Videogame" category at the 5th Annual Arkie Awards. It was the first Intellivision cartridge to have more than 4K of ROM.
- Adventure (Atari 2600) by Atari, Inc. was the first action-adventure video game and first console fantasy game. It is considered to have played an important role in the advancement of home video games and one of the best Atari 2600 titles.
- Asteroids (arcade port) (Atari 2600) was the first game on the 2600 to utilize the bank-switching technique.
- Baseball (Intellivision) by Mattel was the console's best selling title with over one million copies sold.
- Demon Attack (Atari 2600) by Imagic was released in 1983. It won the 1983 Arcade Award for "Best Videogame of the Year". It was the company's best selling game and is considered a classic of the Atari 2600.
- Donkey Kong (arcade port) (ColecoVision) by Coleco was praised for being faithful to the original arcade game. Critics considered it the best version out of the ColecoVision, Atari and Intellivision ports.
- E.T. the Extra-Terrestrial (Atari 2600), released in 1982, is often credited as being one of the worst games of all time. Some believe the game played a significant role in the video game crash of 1983.
- Microsurgeon (Intellivision) by Imagic was praised for its originality. It was included in "The Art of Video Games" exhibit at the Smithsonian Institution in 2012.
- Missile Command (arcade port) (Atari 2600) by Atari, Inc. was released in 1981 and sold more than 2.5 million copies. This made it the third best selling game on the console.
- Pitfall! (Atari 2600) by Activision, released in 1982, was one of the best selling games for the Atari 2600, selling over 4 million copies. Pitfall popularized the side-scrolling platformer genre.
- Pitfall II: Lost Caverns (Atari 2600) by Activision, released in 1984, was one of the most technically impressive titles for the 2600. It came with a specialized audio chip on the cartridge that allowed for advanced music capabilities where music could be changed dynamically.
- River Raid (Atari 2600) by Activision was the first video game to be banned for minors in West Germany. Despite this, it was still one of the most popular titles for the Atari 2600 and won an award for "1984 Best Action Videogame".
- Space Invaders (arcade port) (Atari 2600) by Taito was the first official licensing of an arcade game and was the first "killer app" for video game consoles. Its release saw sales of the Atari 2600 quadruple and was the first title to sell 1 million copies.
- Star Wars: The Empire Strikes Back (Atari 2600) by Parker Brothers was the first officially licensed video game of the Star Wars franchise.
- Utopia (Intellivision) by Don Daglow is often credited with being the first real-time strategy that laid the foundation for many games within the genre.
- Zaxxon (arcade port) (ColecoVision) by Sega was the first home console game to use isometric graphics.

== See also ==
- 1970s in video games
- 1980s in video games
- Home computer (List of home computers)
- History of computing hardware (1960s–present)
