= Loc Blocs =

Construction toy

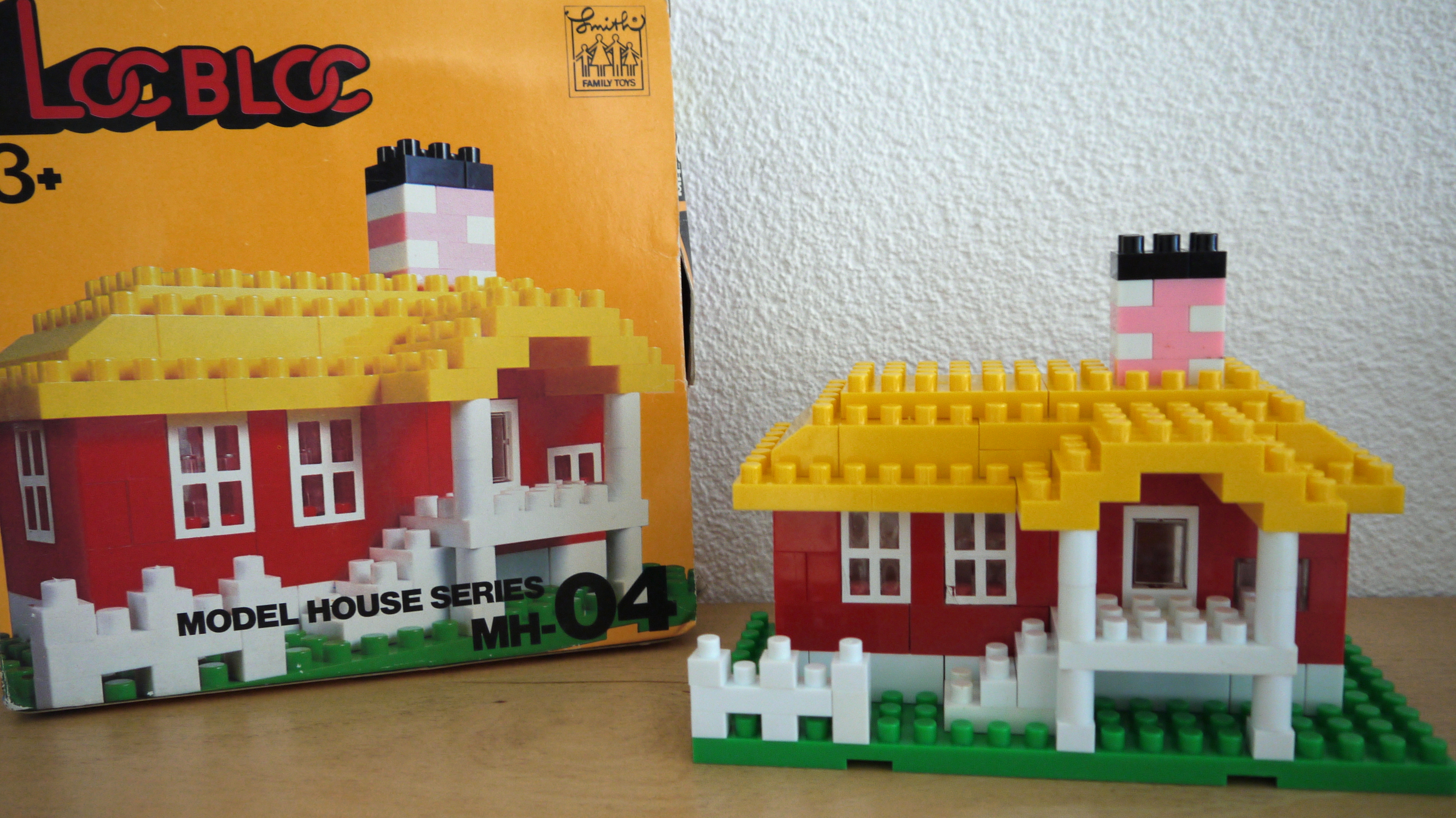
architectural home

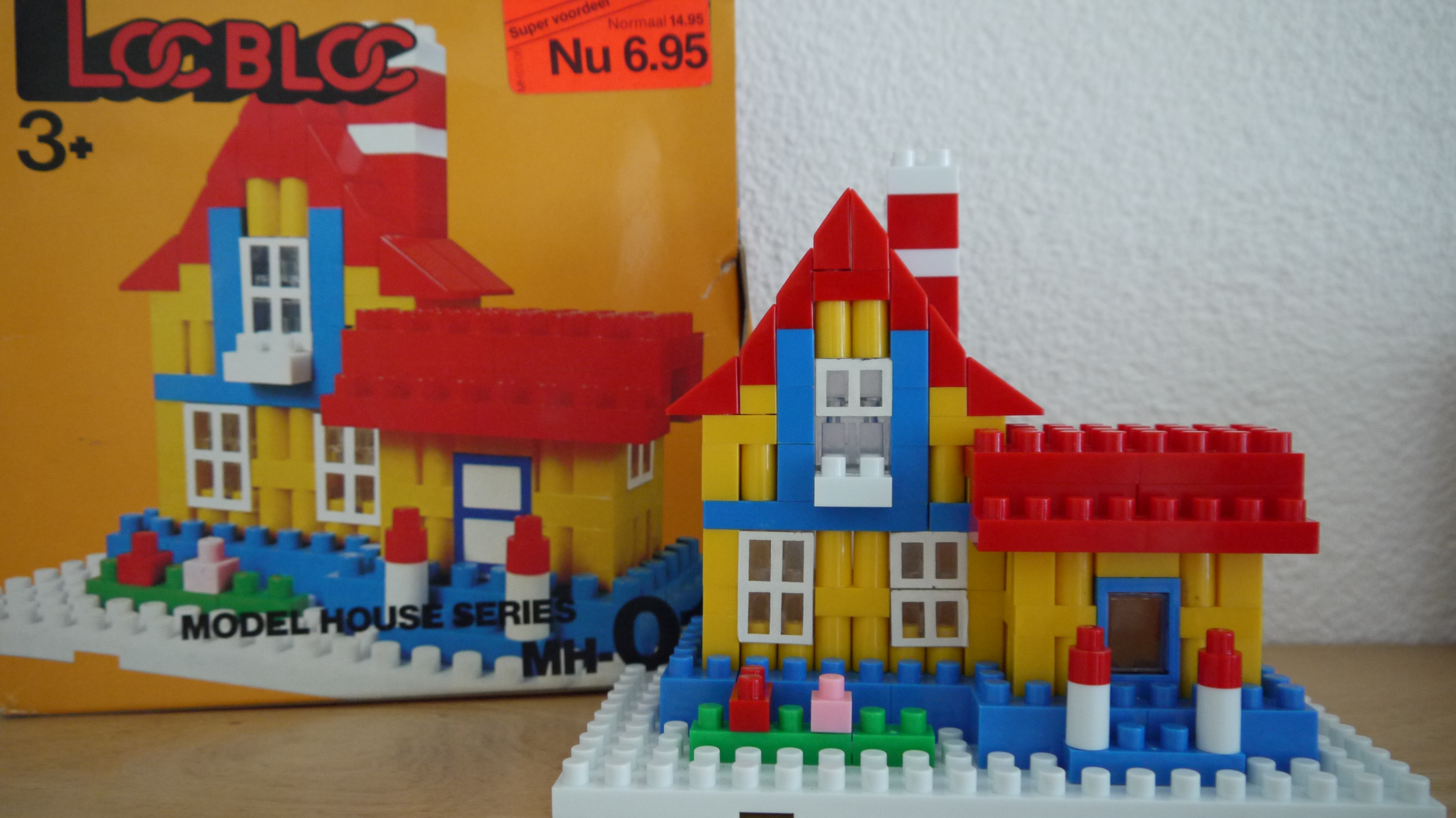
architectural home

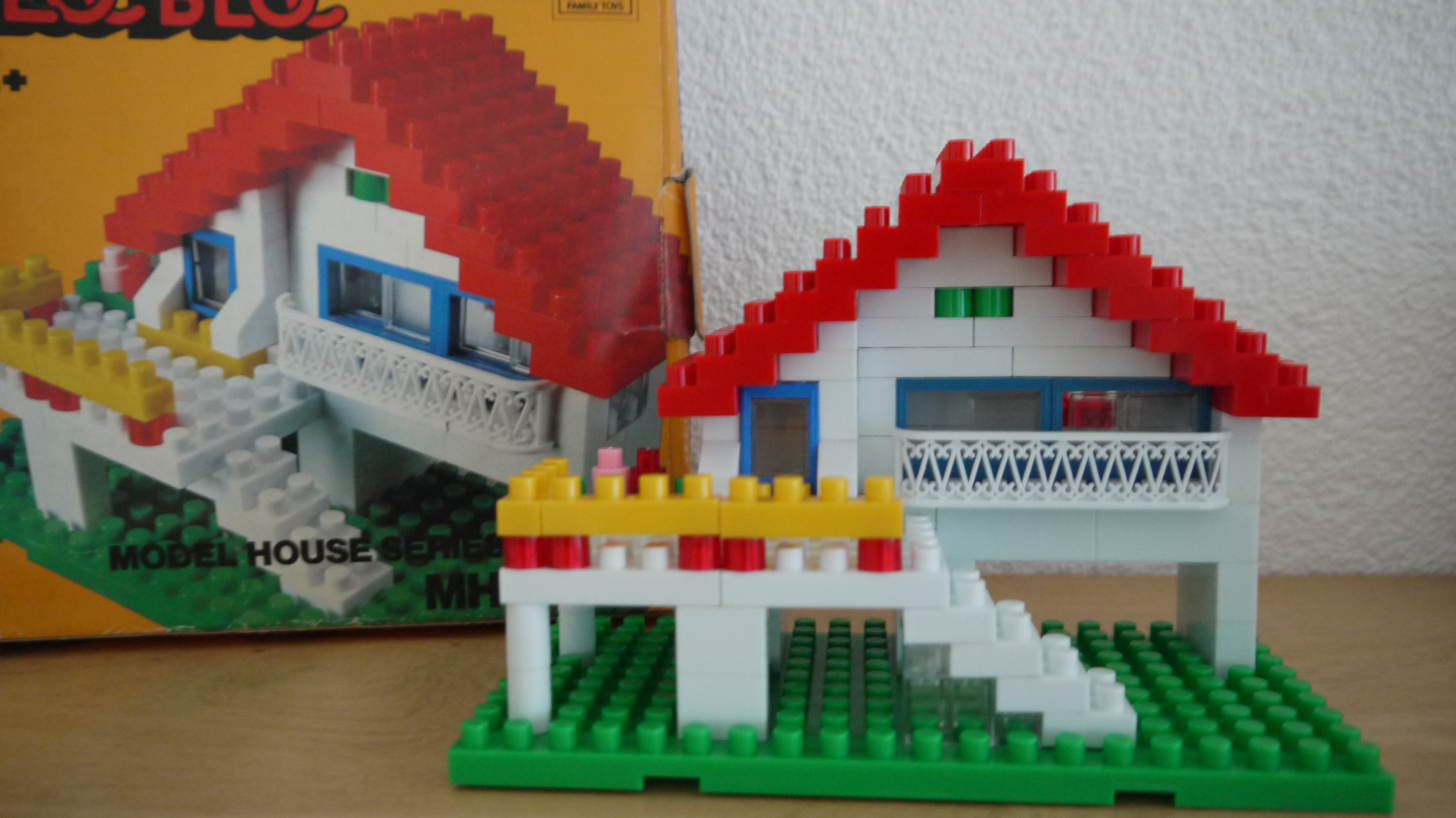
architectural home

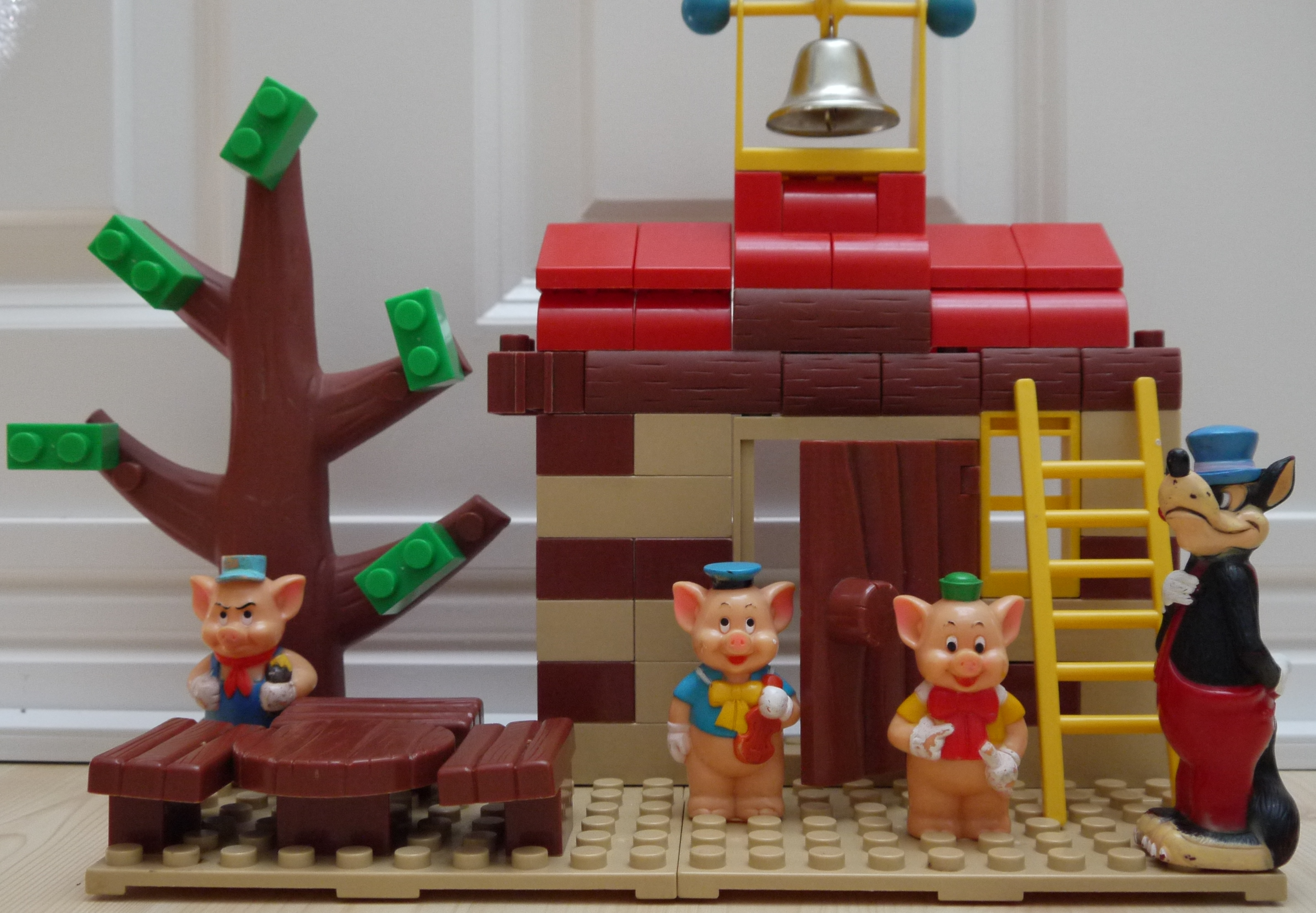
3 little piggies and the big bad wolf

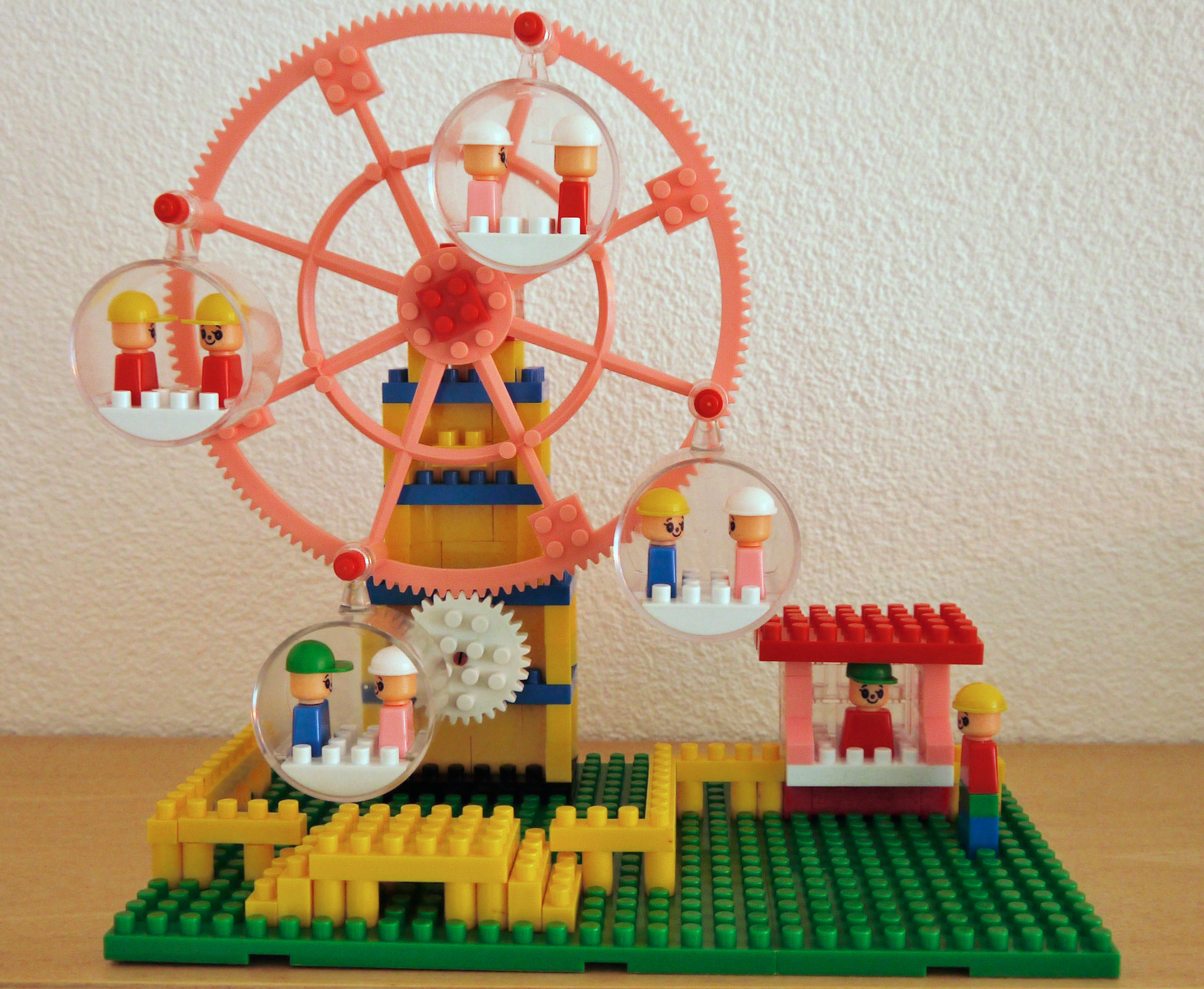
ferris wheel

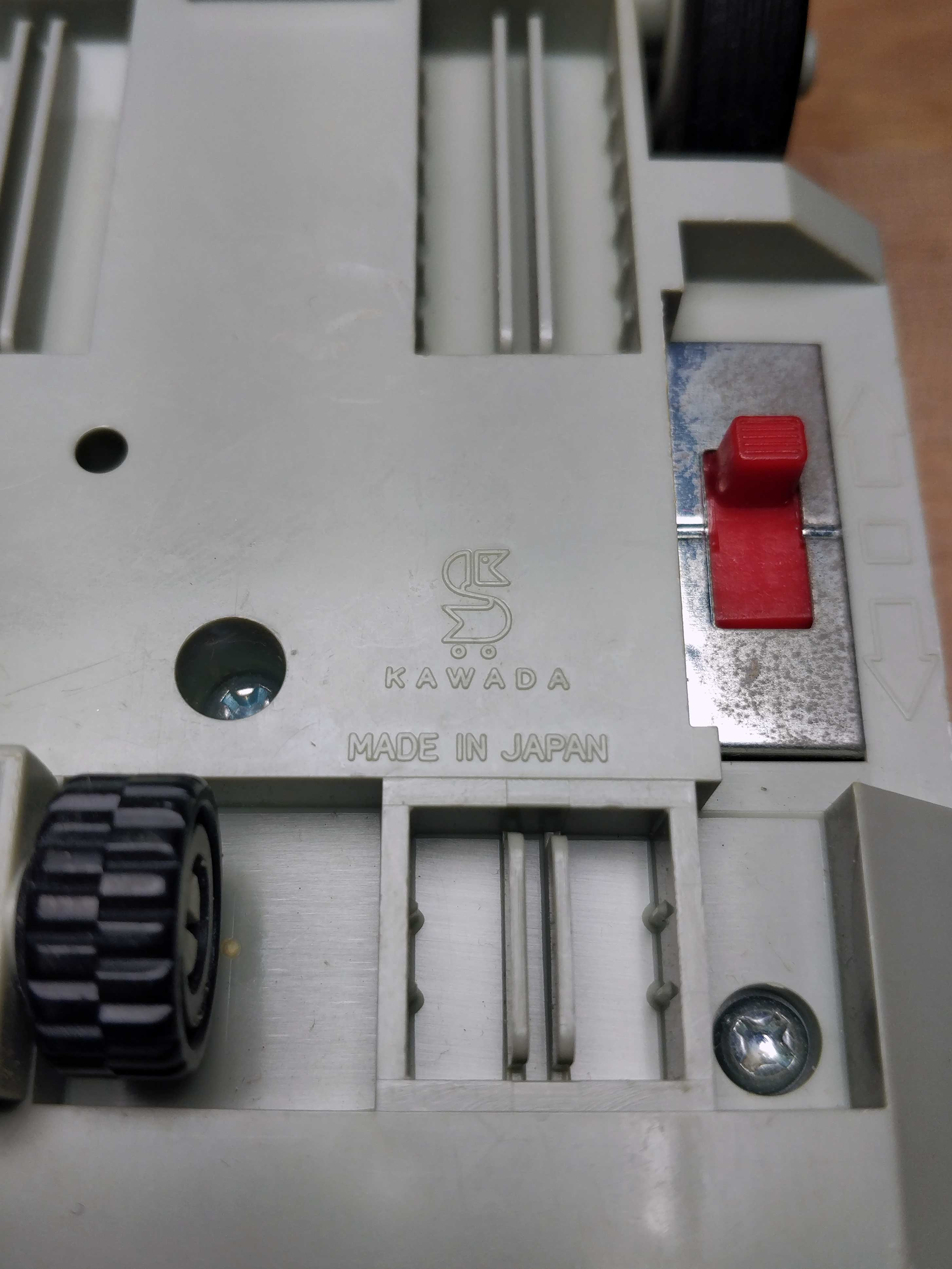
Kawada Co. logo on bottom of motorized base.

Loc Blocs was a plastic block construction toy set. They were marketed in the 1970s and 1980s by Entex Industries and manufactured in Japan as Dia Block by Kawada Co. which still produces sets to this day. They were also sold by Sears under their house brand Brix Blox.

Today, similar blocks are still manufactured in Japan as Diabloks and sold in the US under the name Disney Build-It.

== Compatibility ==
The blocks were of a very similar grid pattern to the LEGO system, but due to existing LEGO patents, were slightly different. Rather than using a stud and tube system, Loc Blocs used a tall stud and short channels on the bottom of bricks. The tall studs were just tall enough to engage the channels. The knobs were too tall and spaced just a little bit off for fitting between LEGO tubes.
