= Turtles (video game) =

1981 video game

- Developer: Konami
- Publishers: Stern (NA); Sega (Japan)
- Platforms: Arcade, Arcadia 2001, Adventure Vision, Odyssey², Casio PV-1000
- Release: 1981: Arcade; 1982: Arcadia 2001, Adventure Vision, Odyssey², handheld 1983: PV-1000
- Genres: Maze
- Modes: Single-player, multiplayer

Turtles is a maze video game developed by Konami and released in arcades in 1981 by Stern and Sega. The Sega version was published as Turpin (ターピン). The player is a turtle trying to bring baby turtles (called "kidturtles") to their homes while avoiding beetles.

The game was ported to an unusual set of home systems. 1982 releases were for the Magnavox Odyssey², Arcadia 2001, and one of the four cartridges for Entex Adventure Vision. A handheld version of Turtles was also released by Entex in 1982. A port for the Casio PV-1000 followed in 1983.

== Gameplay ==
Scattered throughout the maze are boxes with question marks on them. When the player walks over a question mark, a baby turtle crawls onto the main turtle's back, a house will appear at a random location on the map, and the player will have to bring the baby turtle to its house while avoiding beetles. Other times, however, beetles will come out of the boxes, which the player will have to quickly run away from.

The player's only offensive move is the ability to drop bombs (which behave more like mines) to temporarily stun the beetles. Additional bombs can be picked up in the middle of the maze. Each maze represents a floor of the building. After eight floors, there is a cutscene showing the baby turtles following their rescuer out of the building, and gameplay begins again on the ground floor.

== Reception ==
The Odyssey² version of Turtles received a Certificate of Merit in the category of "1984 Best Arcade-to-Home Video Game/Computer Game Translation" at the 5th annual Arkie Awards. Joystik magazine had a different view of the Odyssey port: "There is not much more to this slow-moving game. Even the background music is disappointing and joystick control is awkward."

== Reviews ==
- Games #44
