= Epoch Game Pocket Computer =

Japanese handheld game console

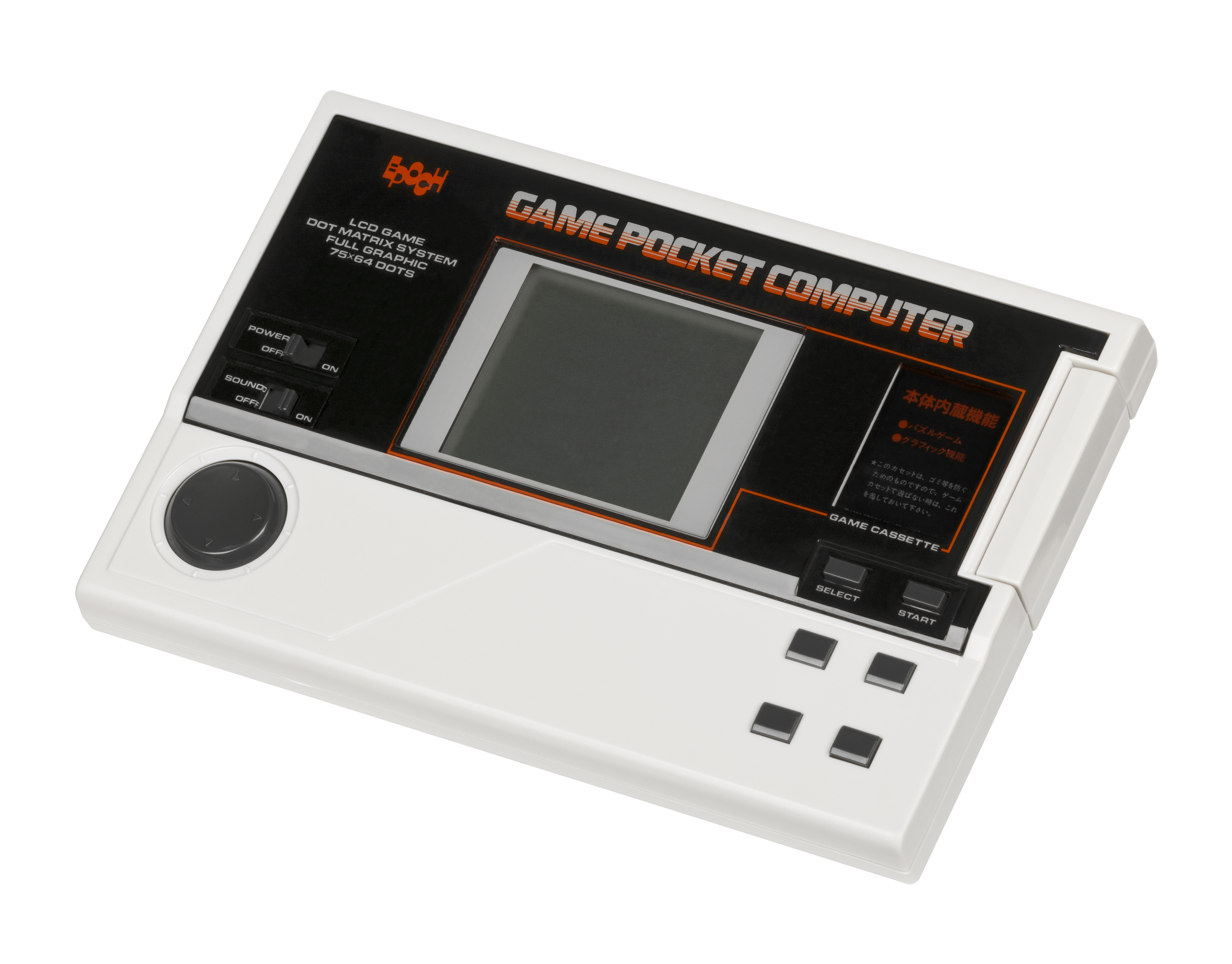
- An Epoch Game Pocket Computer
- Developer: Epoch Co.
- Manufacturer: Epoch Co.
- Type: Handheld game console
- Generation: Second generation
- Released: 1984; 42 years ago
- Introductory price: ¥12,800
- Media: ROM cartridge
- CPU: NEC μPD78C06 @ 6 MHz
- Memory: 2 KB
- Display: Monochrome, 75 × 64 pixels
- Sound: 1 sound channel
- Controller input: 8-way joypad
- Power: 4 AA batteries

The Epoch Game Pocket Computer, also known as the Game Pokekon (Japanese: ゲームポケコン, Hepburn: Gēmupokekon), is a second-generation handheld game console released by Epoch Co. in Japan in 1984 for ¥12,800. It is also known as Pokekon.

The system was a commercial failure in Japan. It was considered expensive for a handheld device at the time, with a price point close to the Famicom. As a result, only 7 games were made for it. A puzzle game and a paint program were built into the system. It was powered by 4 AA batteries, and screen's contrast could be adjusted by the user. Input and output controls included four buttons, an 8-way joypad, a contrast dial, and a sound on-off switch.

== Technical specifications ==
- LCD: monochrome, 75 × 64 pixels
- Power supply: 4 AA batteries
- Battery life: Not clear; >70 hours or 60 hours
- CPU: NEC μPD78C06 clocked at 6 MHz
- RAM: 2 KB
- ROM (cartridges): 8 or 16 KB
- Sound: 1 sound channel

== Games ==
There were a total of 7 different games released for the system.

2 were built into the system. The Built-in Functions (本体内蔵機能, Hontai naizō kinō) cartridge included with the system only serves as instructions and to occupy the cartridge slot, containing no game data, as it doesn't need to be inserted into the system to play the games;

- Puzzle Game (パズルゲーム, Pazurugēmu), an 11 tile version of Fifteen puzzle.
- Graphics function (グラフィック機能, Gurafikku kinō), a Raster graphics editor paint program.

The other 5 were released separately for 2,980 Japanese yen each, excluding Pocket Computer Mahjong which was 3,800 yen;

- Astro Bomber (アストロボンバー, Asutorobombā)
- Block Maze (ブロックメイズ, Burokkumeizu)
- Pocket Computer Mahjong (ポケコンマージャン, Pokekon mājyan)
- Pocket Computer Reversi (ポケコンリバーシ, Pokekon ribāsi)
- Sokoban (倉庫番, sōko-ban)

== See also ==
- Barcode Battler, another handheld game console released by Epoch Co.
