= Entex Building =

Entex Building may refer to:

- 1200 Travis, a 28-storey building in Downtown Houston, Texas, occupied by the Houston Police Department
- Total Plaza, a 35-storey building in Downtown Houston, Texas, occupied by Total Petrochemicals USA
