= Guaifenesin/phenylephrine =

Anti cold and flu preparation

Combination of
- Guaifenesin: Expectorant
- Phenylephrine: α_{1}-adrenergic receptor agonist

Clinical data
- Pregnancy category: AU: B2
- Routes of administration: By mouth

Legal status
- Legal status: US: OTC

Identifiers
- CAS Number: 55-38-9

Guaifenesin/phenylephrine is a combination of the drugs guaifenesin and phenylephrine and is a preparation against the symptoms of cold, flu and allergy. Guaifenesine is an expectorant, phenylephrine is a decongestant. The drug is sold under the brand name Entex and as generic brands. Entex La is 400 mg guaifenesin and 30 mg phenylephrine hydrochloride. Entex Pse is 600 mg guaifenesin and 120 mg phenylephrine hydrochloride. Both are extended release products, meaning that the non-active ingredients are chosen to dissolve slowly to provide a prolonged therapeutic effect.

== Guaifenesin ==
Guaifenesin is an oral medication used to try to help cough out phlegm from the airways. It is often used in combination with other medications. It is believed to work by making airway secretions more liquid. Side effects may include dizziness, sleepiness, skin rash, and nausea. Guaifenesin has been used medically since at least 1933. It is available as a generic medication and an over-the-counter drug.

== Phenylephrine ==
Phenylephrine is an oral medication primarily used as a decongestant. It is a selective α_{1}-adrenergic receptor activator which results in the constriction of both arteries and veins. Common side effects include nausea, headache, and anxiety. Phenylephrine was patented in 1927 and came into medical use in 1938. It is available as a generic medication.
