= Entex Select-A-Game =

Handheld game system

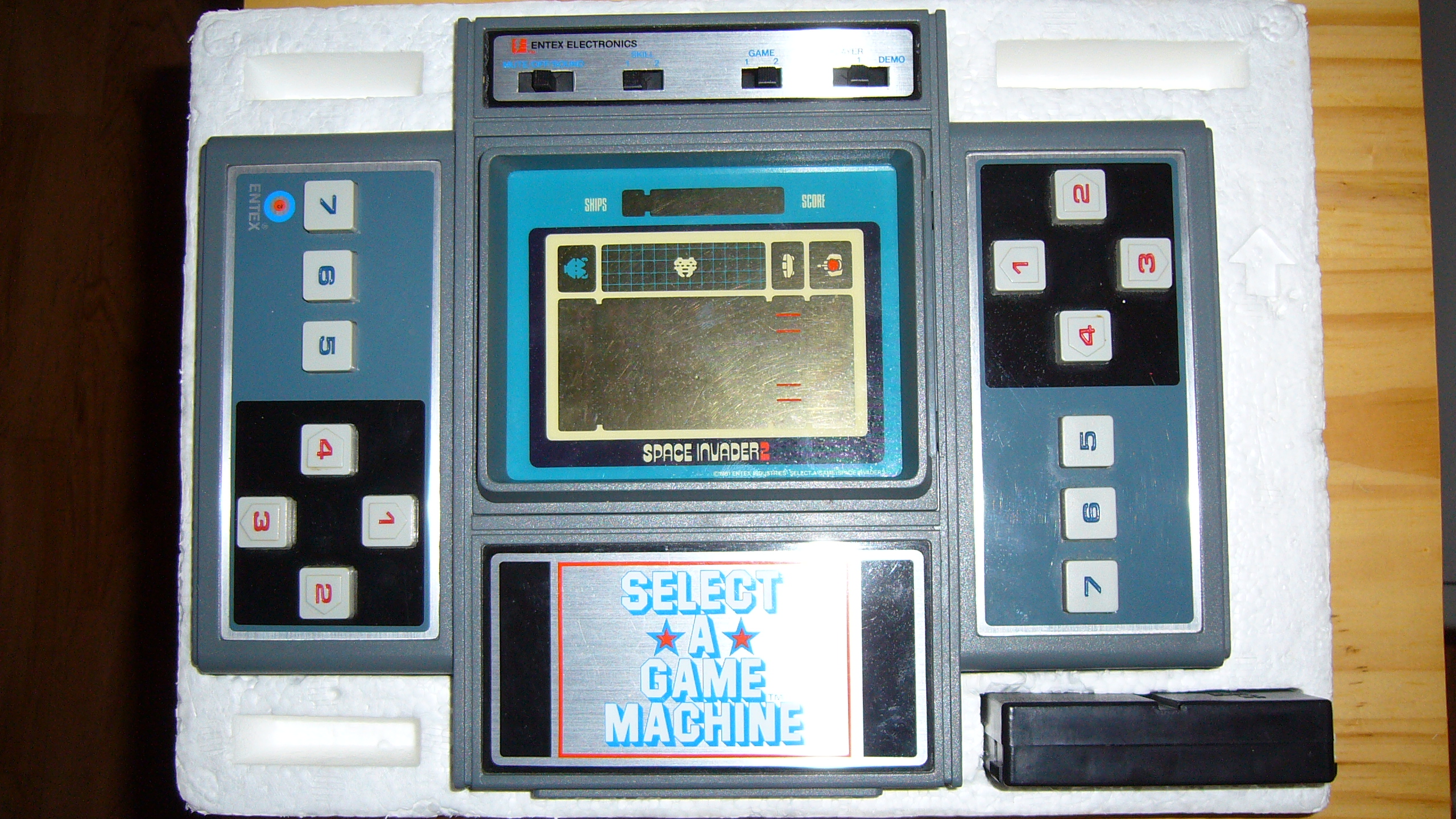
- Manufacturer: Entex Industries
- Type: Video game console
- Generation: Second generation
- Released: 1981; 45 years ago
- Successor: Entex Adventure Vision

The Entex Select-a-game is a handheld game system released in 1981 by Entex Industries. Entex released six games for the device before they dropped support in 1982 in favor of the Entex Adventure Vision.

== Hardware ==
The Select-a-Game uses a 7 x 16 vacuum fluorescent display (VFD) array of large dots as the main display. It can display two colors, red and blue. These are combined with static overlays for each game. Together they make up the display. The system is basically a display and controller for the games with no built-in processor power. Each game cartridge contains a microprocessor programmed with the appropriate game code in it. In this respect, it is very similar to the concept of Milton Bradley's Microvision system released a few years earlier.

The system can be powered by four C batteries, or by an external A/C power supply. The power supply was only available by mail-order.

== Games ==
The games released for the system are:

- Space Invader 2
- Basketball 3
- Football 4
- Pinball
- Baseball 4
- Pacman 2
- Battleship (not released)
- Turtles (not released)

Space Invader 2 came with the system. In late 1981, Entex was sued by Coleco, who held the licensing rights to handheld versions of Pac-Man at the time, for copyright infringement over their upcoming release of Pacman 2. The game was pulled shortly after release as part of the settlement. Because of this, Pacman 2 is the rarest game released for the system. The game cartridges play very similar to their handheld counterparts (Entex made quite a few handheld games such as Space Invader 2, Basketball 3, Pacman 2, etc.).
