= Entex Adventure Vision =

Second-generation video game console

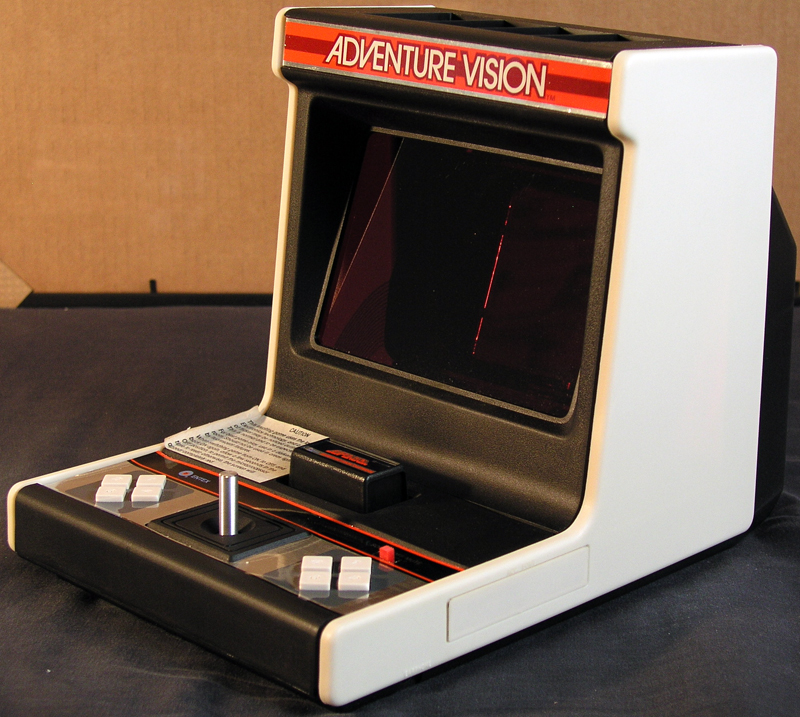
- Manufacturer: Entex Industries
- Type: Video game console
- Generation: Second generation
- Released: August 1982; 44 years ago
- Introductory price: $79.95
- Discontinued: 1983
- Units sold: 50,757
- Media: ROM cartridge
- CPU: Intel 8048 @ 733 kHz
- Memory: 64 bytes, 1K
- Display: 150 x 40 monochrome oscillating red LED display
- Sound: National Semiconductor COP411L @ 52.6 kHz
- Dimensions: 13.25 by 10 by 9 inches (337 mm × 254 mm × 229 mm)
- Predecessor: Entex Select-A-Game

Adventure Vision is a cartridge-based video game console released by Entex Industries in either August 1982. The launch price of the system was $79.95. The monitor, game controls, and computer hardware are all contained within a single portable unit. The LED monitor can only display red pixels. Four games were released, all of which are arcade ports. Approximately 10,000 were produced.

Adventure Vision was Entex's second-generation system following the Entex Select-A-Game, released a year earlier in 1981.

== Description ==
Control is through a single multi-position joystick and two sets of four buttons, one on each side of the joystick, for ease of play by both left- and right-handed players. Rather than using an LCD screen or an external television set like other systems of the time, the Adventure Vision uses a single vertical line of 40 red LEDs combined with a spinning mirror inside the casing. This allows for an effective screen resolution of 150 × 40 pixels. To produce the image, the LEDs flash in patterns representing sequential vertical segments of a virtual projected screen, which is precisely timed to the rotation speed of the mirror. As the light patterns shine on the mirror, they are reflected at specific angles into the player's eyes, with each segment appearing to blend into a single image through persistence of vision. The mirror motor draws a great deal of power from the batteries, which can be avoided by using the built-in AC adapter.

== Games ==
Entex released four Adventure Vision games, all of them ported from arcades:

- Defender, originally by Williams Electronics
- Super Cobra, originally by Konami
- Turtles, originally by Konami
- Space Force, originally by Venture Line (similar to Asteroids)

== Technical specifications ==
- CPU: Intel 8048 @ 733 kHz
- Sound: National Semiconductor COP411L @ 52.6 kHz, headphone jack
- RAM: 64 bytes (internal to 8048), 1K (on main PCB)
- ROM: 1K (internal to 8048), 512 bytes (internal to COP411L), 4K (cartridge)
- Input: 4 direction joystick, 4 buttons duplicated on each side of the joystick
- Graphics: 150x40 monochrome red pixels
- Expansion port
- Dimensions: 13.25 by 10 by 9 inches (337 mm × 254 mm × 229 mm)

== Legacy ==
A similar display technique combining red LEDs with a moving mirror was used by Nintendo in the 1995 Virtual Boy.

Because of the moving parts used by the system, many units no longer work, with an estimated 100 known operational units left.

On March 31, 2013 at the Revision demoparty, the first-ever homebrew/demo ROM for the system was demonstrated by MEGA - Museum of Electronic Games & Art. MEGA also released the source code for the demo as well as all development tools.

The system is supported by the MESS emulator and AdViEmulator.

== See also ==
- Vectrex
- Nintendo Virtual Boy - 1995 video game console with a similar mechanical method of operation.
