= Entex Industries =

American toy and electronic game manufacturer

Entex Industries, Inc.
- Industry: Toys and Electronic games
- Founded: 1970
- Founder: G.A. (Tony) Clowes, Nicholas Carlozzi and Nick Underhill
- Headquarters: Compton, California, U.S.

Entex Industries, Inc. was an American toy and electronic game manufacturer based in Compton, California. The company was active during the 1970s and 1980s.

== Background ==
The company was formed in 1970 by G.A. (Tony) Clowes, Nicholas Carlozzi and Nick Underhill. It was based at 303 West Artesia Blvd, Compton. Its name was derived from taking Nicholas' and Tony's initials and adding an 'X' on the end to form NTX, which when spoken sounds like Entex. Nick Underhill's initial was not included as he had joined the company after the name had already been chosen, but before it opened for business. The company logo consisted of an RAF bullseye with a smiling face in the middle. In 1980, the company achieved sales in excess of $100 million. The company folded in the early eighties, due in part to increasing competition from video game consoles and computer games which quickly became a preferred form of entertainment, much to the cost of the electronic games industry.

== Products ==
The company originally made model kits and Lego-like connectable toy bricks called Loc Blocs, before later moving into the handheld and tabletop electronic game market. Electronic games produced by Entex have been described as "high end" and "high-quality" and the company itself used the motif "Games for the discriminating player", indicating that the more expensive end of the market was specifically targeted. Many Entex products were rebadged and sold under license outside the US.

=== Conventional Electronic Games ===
Entex produced LCD, LED and VFD-based electronic games, including 3-D Grand Prix, Blast It, Defender and Pac Man 2 amongst others. In 1976, Entex Industries released the Gameroom Tele-Pong dedicated home video game console.

=== Programmable Electronic Games ===
In order to compete with video consoles, Entex introduced two cartridge based tabletop electronic game systems in 1981–1982, called Select-A-Game and Adventure Vision. In particular, the Adventure Vision, along with its cartridges have become highly sought after collector's items.
