= List of first generation home video game consoles =

The first generation of video game consoles lasted from 1972 to 1983. The first console of this generation was the 1972 Magnavox Odyssey. The last new console release of the generation was most likely the Compu-Vision 440 by radio manufacturer Bentley in 1983, though other systems were also released in that year.

== Repetition and similarities ==
=== Naming ===
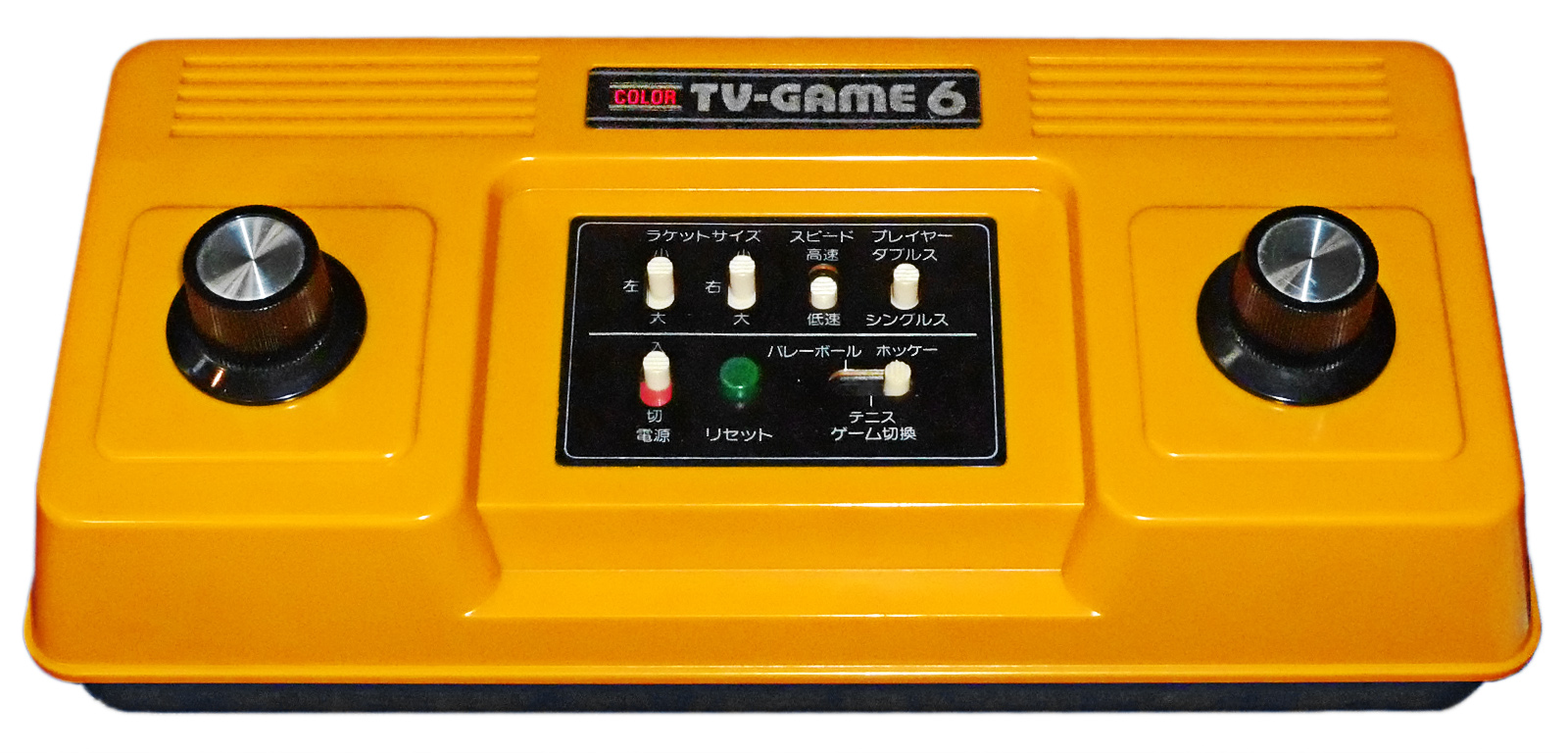
Nintendo's first console, the Color TV-Game 6, has one of the most generic names, sharing every element often repeated in other titles.

Manufacturers placed emphasis on what the console was and what it could do to differentiate the console. The most common elements were usually:

- TV – Indicating the device utilized television to display its output.
- Color – Indicating the machine was capable of outputting color.
- Game – Indicating a game that could be played.
- Sport(s) – Indicating a sports genre game could be played.
- A number – Usually indicating the quantity of games available on the system.

=== Identical consoles ===
Many consoles were copies of others, had very similar form factors with different inputs, or were distributed under different names in different regions. An example is the Binatone line that was released simultaneously under the names "Mentor" and "Tokyo". Name changes are most commonly exemplified by the Sears Tele-Games line, which consisted of existing Coleco, APF and Atari Consoles. The only difference was the Sears branding.

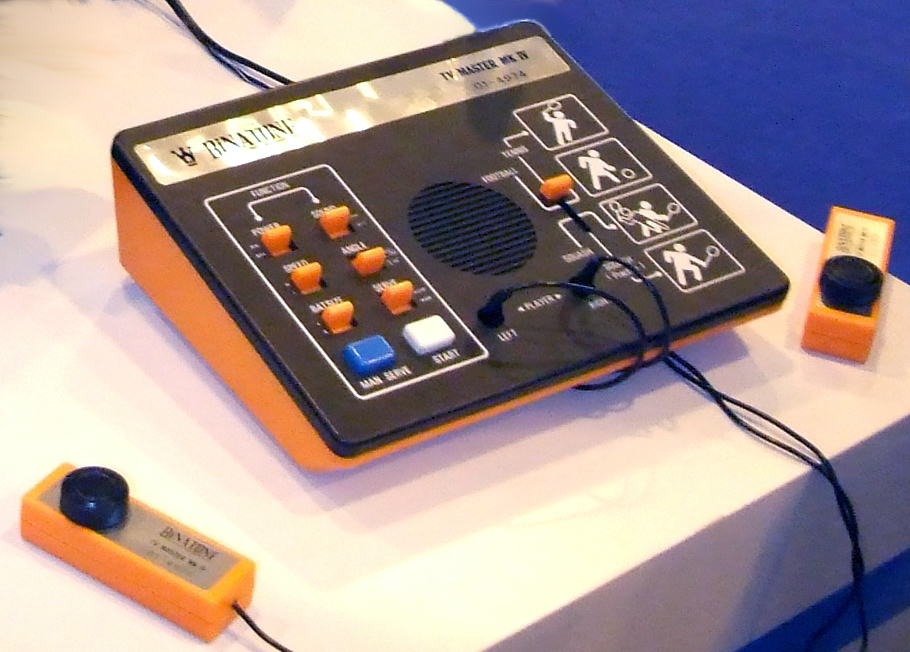
Binatone TV Master Mk IV (1977)

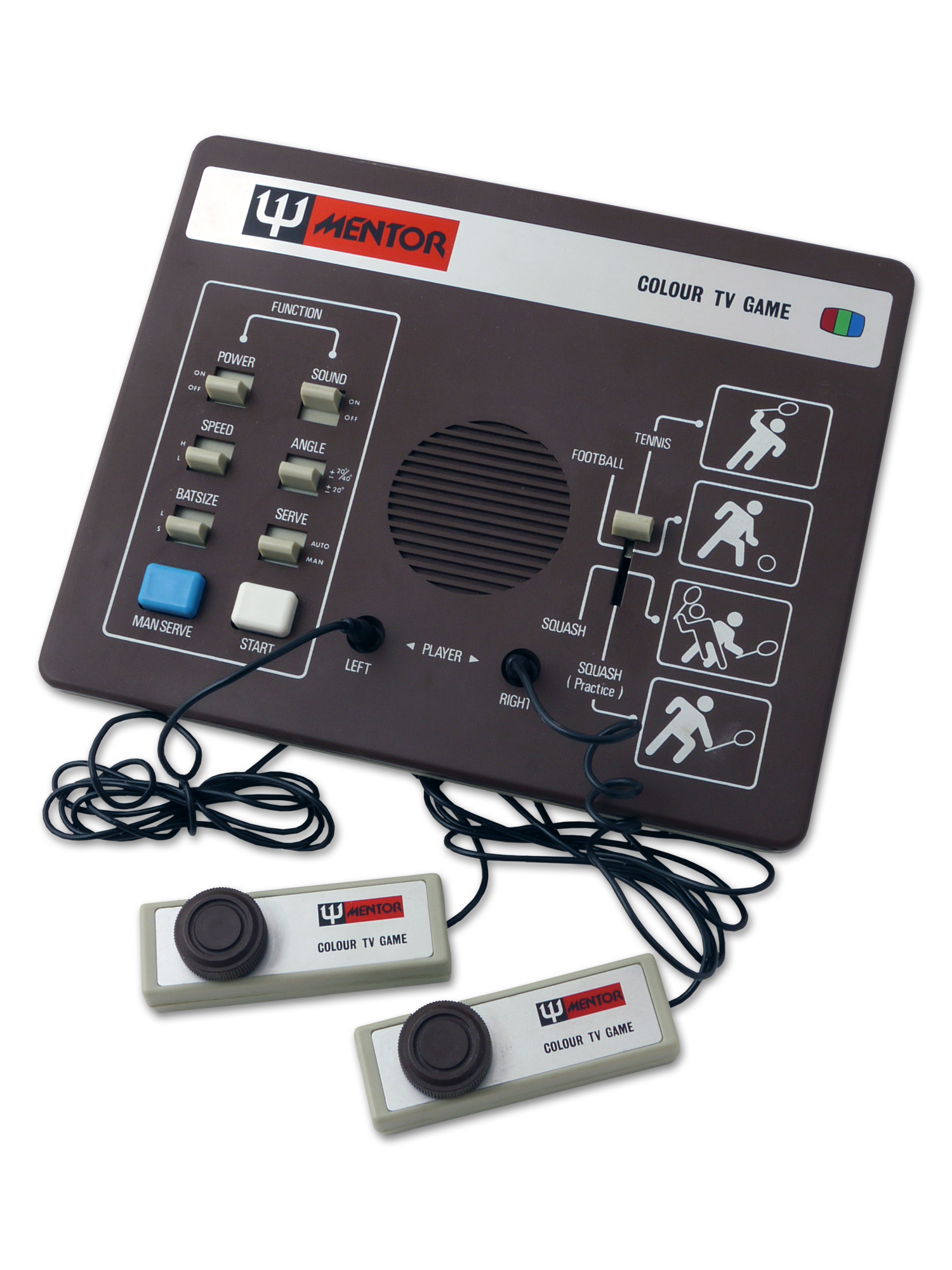
Mentor Colour TV Game (1977)

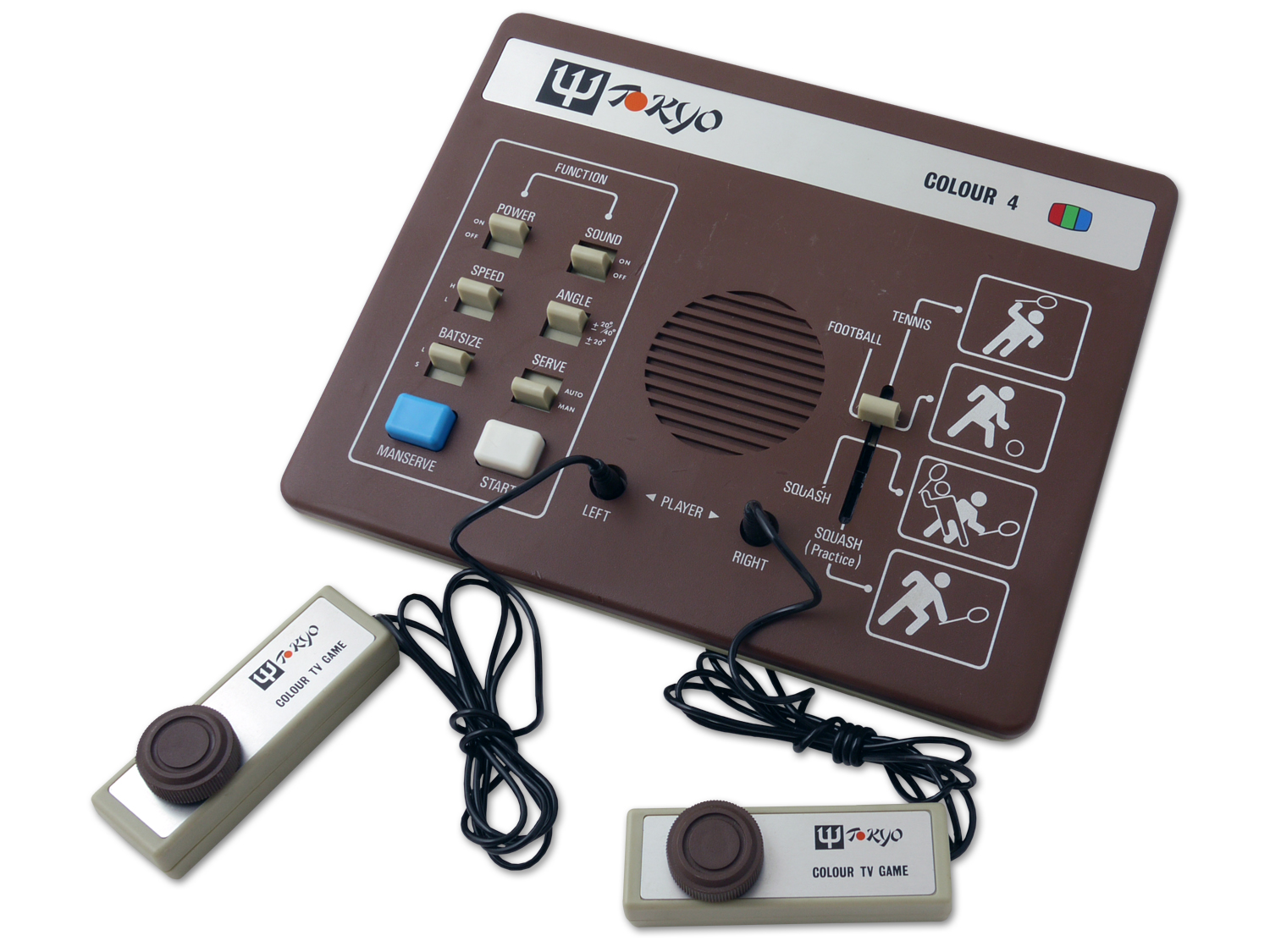
Tokyo Colour 4

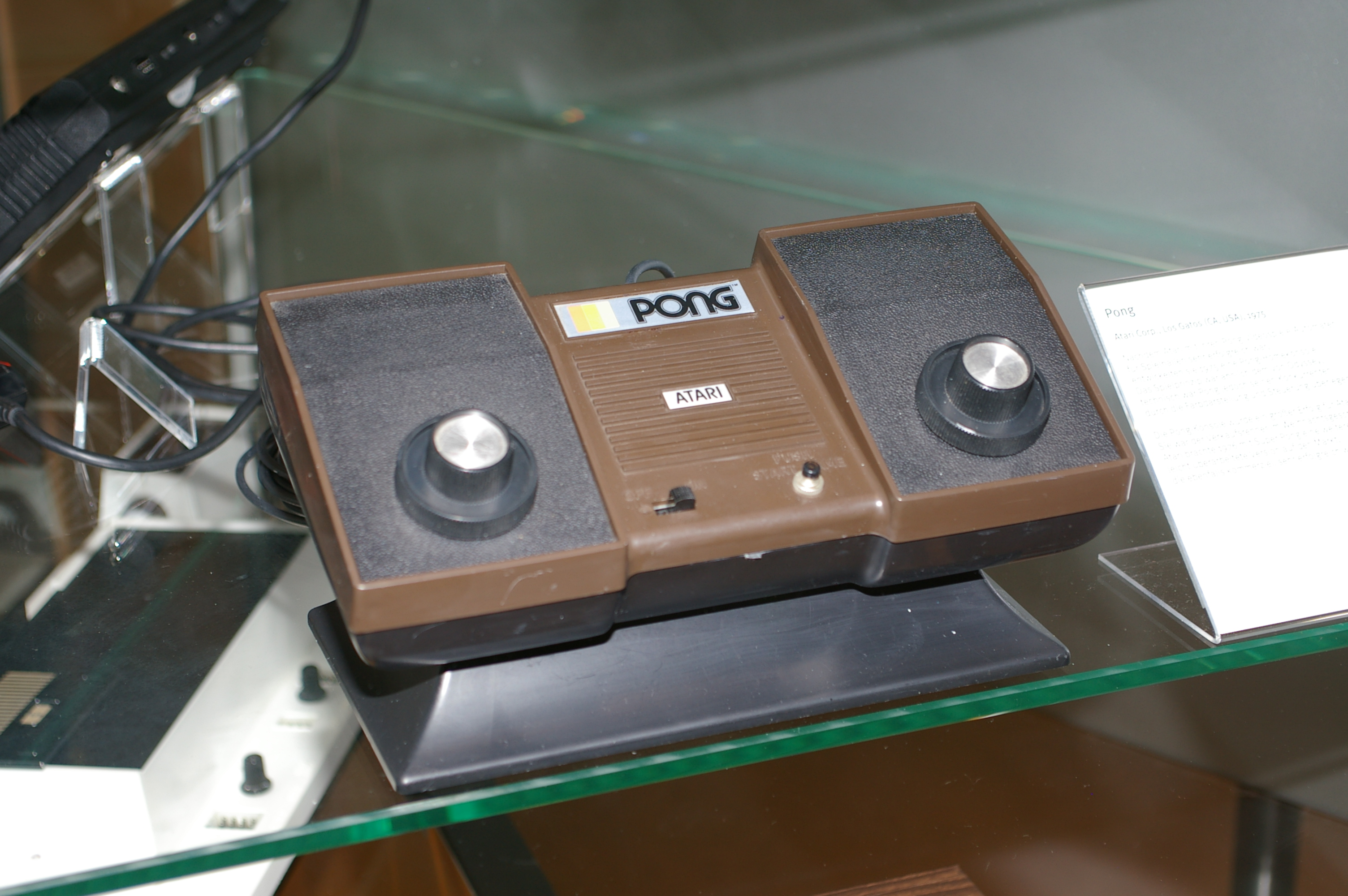
The original version of Home PONG

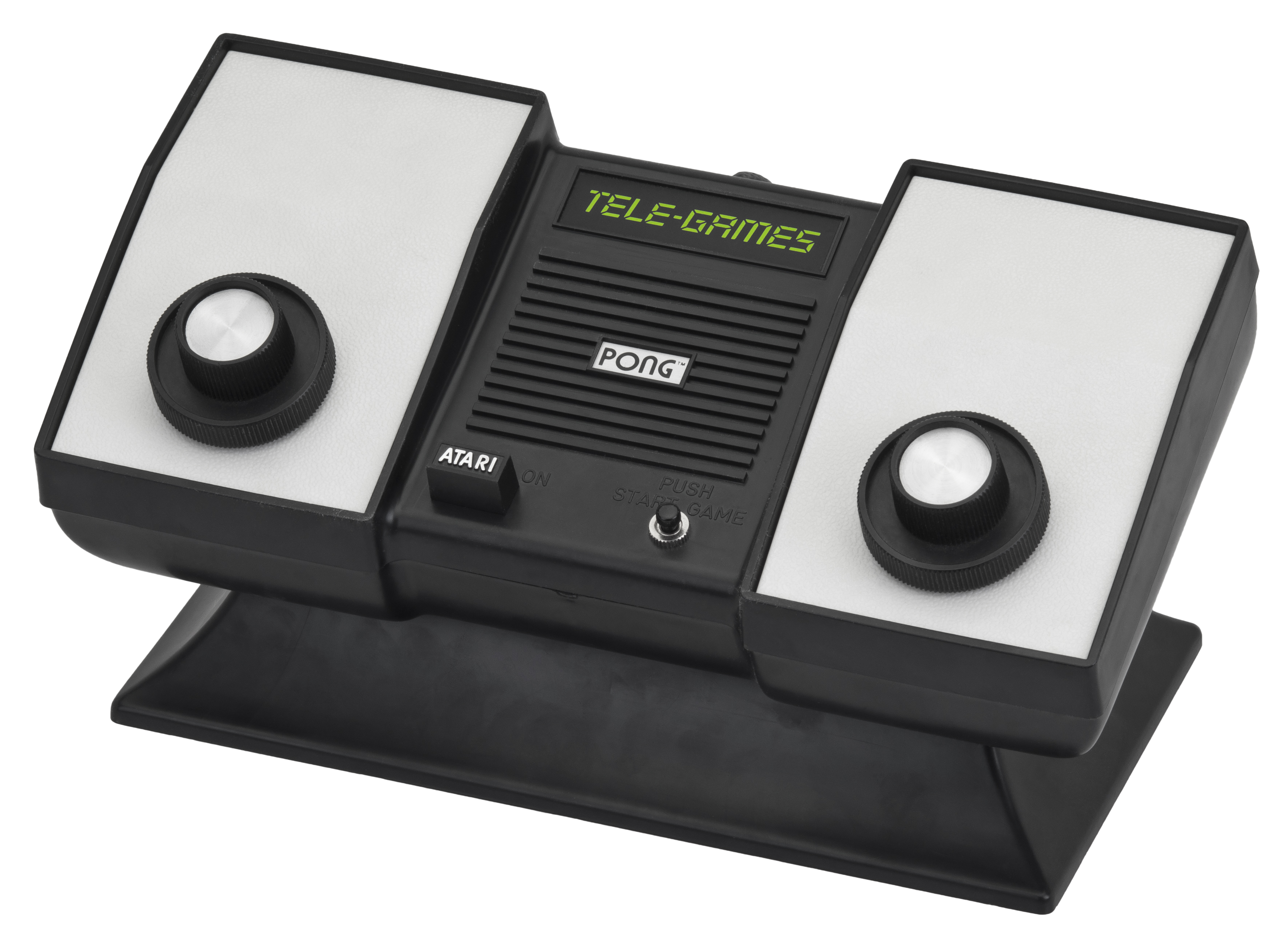
The Sears Tele-Games version

== Market saturation ==
Background shading indicates transition to second generation.

Name	First console	Year	Next generation system	Year	Generation
Acetronic	Tele-Sports IV	1978	MPU-1000	1979	Second
APF	TV Fun 401	1976	APF-MP 1000	1978	Second
Atari Inc.	Home Pong	1975	2600	1977	Second
Audiosonic	PP-420	1977	1292 Advanced Programmable Video System	1978	Second
Bandai	TV Jack 1000	1977	Super Vision 8000	1979	Second
Coleco	Telstar	1976	ColecoVision	1982	Second
Commodore	TV Game 2000K	1975	Commodore 64 Games System	1990	Third
Entex	Gameroom Tele-Pong	1976	Select-A-Game Machine	1981	Second
Epoch	TV Tennis Electrotennis	1975	Cassette Vision	1981	Second
Grandstand	Match of the Day 2000	1977	Light Games	1988	Fourth
Interton	Video 2000	1976	VC 4000	1978	Second
Magnavox	Odyssey	1972	Odyssey 2	1978	Second
Nintendo	Color TV-Game 6	1977	Family Computer	1983	Third
Philips	Philips Tele-Game ES 2201	1975	Videopac G7000	1978	Second
Radofin	Black & White TV Game	1977	1292 Advanced Programmable Video System	1979	Second
Tandy/Radio Shack	TV Scoreboard	1976	Tandy Memorex Video Information System	1992	Fourth
Tomy	Color Model 601	1977	Pyuuta Jr.	1983	Third
Unisonic	Sportsman T101	1976	Champion 2711	1978	Second

== List ==
The following is a list in alphabetical order of the manufacturers, followed by the name of the console, release year, integrated chip if it had one, and whether it came with a light gun or the option to buy one separately. This list is in no way complete, as there are hundreds of consoles, some with color, name, or hardware variations. This list contains 1036 consoles.

For comparison, there are 98 home platforms starting with the second generation, and 57 handheld consoles, totaling 155. (Note: This number is always up to date by this script.)

=== Released systems ===
Console	Manufacturer	Logo	Year	Country	Description	Image	CPU	Additional input	Games count	External reference
Color (model TVG 57253)	@ Mark		1978	Sweden	Pong Console		In PC-50x cartridges			
Modell 64562	@ Mark		1978	Sweden	Pong Console		In PC-50x cartridges			
Ags TVG 101-4	A.G.S. Electronics Ltd.		1977	Canada	Pong console		AY-3-8500		4	
Video Game (D-5654)	Academy		1977	United Kingdom	Pong console; pre-installed games		AY-3-8500		4	
Most Exciting Home Video Game (D-5614)	Academy		1977	United Kingdom	Pong console		AY-3-8500		4	
Video Game (D-5715)	Academy		1977	United Kingdom	Pong console; pre-installed games			light gun	6	
TVG-406-6	Academy		1977	United Kingdom	Home Pong console			light gun	6	
D-5996 Programmable TV Game Console	Academy		1977	United Kingdom	PC-50x series		In PC-50x cartridges			
Tele-Sports IV	Acetronic		1978	United Kingdom	PC-50x Pong console		In PC-50x cartridges			
Colour TV Game	Acetronic		1978	United Kingdom	Pong console			light gun	10	
Sports-Action TV Game 922	Acetronic		1977	United Kingdom	Pong console			light gun	6	
TV Game T-800	Ajax		1977	United Kingdom	Pong console		AY-3-8500		4	
TV Game TVG-621	Ajax		1977	United Kingdom	Pong console		AY-3-8500		4	
T-338	Ajax		1977	United Kingdom	Pong console		AY-3-8500		4	
Color Video Game BM-1000	Ajax		1977	United Kingdom	Pong console		AY-3-8500	light gun	6	
TV Game (TVG-406-6)	Ajax		1977	United Kingdom	Pong console		AY-3-8500	light gun	6	
TV Game AU-807	Ajax		1977	United Kingdom	Pong console		AY-3-8500		4	
Programaster 1125	Ajax		1978	United Kingdom	PC-50x Pong console		In PC-50x cartridges			
TV Sports	Ajax		1977	United Kingdom	Pong console				4	
Colour Video Sport	Ajax		1977	United Kingdom	Pong console, clone of Sheen Color Video 106C		AY-3-8500	light gun	6	
TVG-SD-01-8 Color	Akur		1977	Germany	Pong console		AY-3-8500	light gun	6	
Video SD-050	Akur		1978	Germany	PC-50x series		In PC-50x cartridges			
Visiomatic 101	Alcatel		1977	France; People's Republic of China	Pong console produced by Alcatel and sold by Pizon Bros		AY-3-8500	light gun	7	old-computers.com ID
Video Spiel TG-621	Alex		1977	Germany	Pong console		AY-3-8500		4	old-computers.com ID
Videotronic II (3338)	Alfa Electronics PTE. LTD.			Singapore	Black case; black and white video output		AY-3-8500		4	
Videotronic II (8550C)	Alfa Electronics PTE. LTD.		1976	Singapore	Pong console; color video output		AY-3-8550		4	
Videotronic	Alfa Electronics PTE. LTD.			Singapore	Discrete Pong console; black case, controller with 2 paddles,pre-installed games				3	
TV Spel AU-807	Algemene Bank Nederland		1977	Netherlands	Pong console (= Ajax Pong console)		AY-3-8500		4	
TV Spel T-338	Algemene Bank Nederland		1977	Netherlands	Dutch Pong console (= Ajax Pong console)		AY-3-8500		4	
Name Of The Game (A-100)	Allied's		1976	United States	Pong console with two or four player; four pre-installed games: handball, tennis, hockey, target		MPS-7600-001	light gun	4	
Name of the Game II (A-300)	Allied's		1976	United States	Pong console; only two players and four pre-installed games: practice, handball, tennis, hockey		MPS-7600-001		4	
AllOrgan 3000	AllOrgan		1977	Korea	Pong game home console		AY-3-8500		4	
Allorgan 5000	AllOrgan		1977	Korea	Pong game console				6	
Electronic TV Game Centre Model 15	Alltronic		1977	Germany	Pong console		AY-3-8500	light gun	6	
HK 1350	Alltronic		1977	Germany	Pong console			light gun	6	
7000 Color	Alltronic		1978	Germany	PC-50x series		In PC-50x cartridges			
Stadium 4002	Ameltone		1977	United Kingdom	Pong console		AY-3-8500		4	
Stadium BW-11	Ameltone		1977	United Kingdom	Pong console		AY-3-8500	light gun	6	
Stadium Colour C-22	Ameltone		1977	United Kingdom	Pong console			light gun	6	
TVG-SD-01	Ameltone		1977	United Kingdom	Pong home console				4	
Stadium C-4003	Ameltone		1977	United Kingdom	Pong console		AY-3-8500	light gun	6	
Most Exciting Home Video Game D-5614	Ameltone		1977	United Kingdom	Pong console		AY-3-8500		4	
TV Fun 401	APF Electronics, Inc.		1976	United States	Pong home console		AY-3-8500		4	old-computers.com ID
TV Fun 401A	APF Electronics, Inc.		1977	United States	Pong console		AY-3-8500		4	
TV Fun Sportsarama 402 - 402C	APF Electronics, Inc.		1977	United States	Pong console		MPS-7600-001	light gun paddle	8	
TV Fun Match 405	APF Electronics, Inc.		1977	United States	Pong console		AY-3-8500		4	old-computers.com ID
TV Fun 405a	APF Electronics, Inc.		1977	United States	Pong console		AY-3-8500		4	
TV Fun 406	APF Electronics, Inc.		1977	United States	Pong console		AY-3-8500		4	
TV Fun 442	APF Electronics, Inc.		1977	United States	Pong console		TMS-1955		4	
TV Fun 444	APF Electronics, Inc.		1977	United States	Pong console				4	
Asaflex 6	Asaflex		1977	France	Pong console		AY-3-8500	light gun	6	old-computers.com ID
Video Sports 2000	Asaflex		1977	France	Pong console		AY-3-8500		4	
Video Sports	Asaflex		1977	France	Pong home console		AY-3-8500		4	
TVG-209-4	Asaki		1977	Italy	Pong console; pre-installed games				4	
TVG 200	Asaki		1977	Italy	Pong console; pre-installed games				6	
Ultra Pong Doubles (C-402 D)	Atari, Inc.		1977	United States	Pong home console		C010765		16	old-computers.com ID
Game Brain (C-700)	Atari, Inc.			United States	Unreleased Pong home console supposed to be released in 1978				10	
Pong (model C-100)	Atari, Inc.		1975	United States	Pong home console		3659-1C/C2566		1	Gaming-History ID old-computers.com ID
Super Pong (C-140)	Atari, Inc.		1977	United States	Four games pong console		C010073-3		4	old-computers.com ID The Video Games Museum system ID The Video Games Museum system ID
Super Pong Ten (C-180)	Atari, Inc.		1976	United States	Ten games pong console		C010073-01/C2607		10	MobyGames game ID MobyGames game ID (former scheme); MobyGames game ID (former scheme) MobyGames game ID
Stunt Cycle (C-450)	Atari, Inc.		1977	United States	Games: stunt cycle, drag race, motocross, enduro				4	old-computers.com ID
Hockey Pong (C-121)	Atari, Inc.		1976	United States	Dedicated home Pong console				4	
Video Pinball C-380 (woodgrain)	Atari, Inc.		1977	United States	Home pinball console		C011500-11/C011512-05		7	old-computers.com ID Gaming-History ID
Video Pinball C-380 (white)	Atari, Inc.		1977	United States	Home pinball game console		C011500-11/C011512-05		7	
Super Pong PRO-AM (C-200)	Atari, Inc.		1977	United States	Five games pong console		C010073-01/C2607		5	
Super Pong PRO-AM Ten (C-202)	Atari, Inc.		1977	United States	Pong home console				10	
Ultra Pong (C-402 S)	Atari, Inc.		1977	United States	Pong console. Sixteen games, two players. Identical to Ultra Pong Doubles but for two players only		C010765		16	
Pong Doubles (C-160)	Atari, Inc.		1976	United States	Pong home console prototype		3659-3		1	
TV-Player 1	Atomic		1977	Germany	Pong console manufactured for Car Safety		AY-3-8500		4	
TV-Player II	Atomic		1977	Germany	Pong console manufactured for Car Safety				4	
PP-800	Audiosonic		1977	Netherlands	Pong Console		AY-3-8500		4	old-computers.com ID
Color TV Game PP-160	Audiosonic		1982	Netherlands	Pong console		AY-3-8500		4	
Home's TV Set PP-600	Audiosonic		1977	Netherlands	Pong console		AY-3-8500		4	
Most Exciting Home Video Game PP-420	Audiosonic		1977	Netherlands	Pong console		AY-3-8500		4	
PP-150	Audiosonic		1978	Netherlands	Pong console				4	
PP-790	Audiosonic		1978	Netherlands	PC-50x series		In PC-50x cartridges			
PP-795	Audiosonic		1978	Netherlands	9012 console type (PC-50x series)		In PC-50x cartridges			
PP-900	Audiosonic		1977	Netherlands	Pong console			light gun	6	
Tele-Sports IV	Audiosonic		1978	Netherlands	PC-50x series		In PC-50x cartridges			old-computers.com ID
Programmable tele-sports III	Audiosonic		1978	Netherlands	PC-50x series		In PC-50x cartridges			
PP-920 (920B)	Audiosonic		1978	Netherlands	Pong console (different case from 920C and 920D)			light gun	6	
PP-920C	Audiosonic		1978	Netherlands	Pong console (different case from 920, 920B and 920D)			light gun	6	
PP-920D	Audiosonic		1978	Netherlands	Pong console (different case from 920, 920B and 920C)			light gun	6	
PP-930	Audiosonic		1978	Netherlands	Handheld Pong console			light gun	6	
PP-940	Audiosonic		1978	Netherlands	Home Pong console			light gun	6	
Most Exciting Home Video Game TVG-201 (TVG 201-4)	Audiosonic		1978	Netherlands	Pong console				4	
TVG-4	Audiosonic		1978	Netherlands	Pong console				4	
TVG-6 Color TV game	Audiosonic		1978	Netherlands	Pong console			light gun	6	
Tele-Sports Mini	Audiosonic		1978	Netherlands	Handeld. Identical to Coleco, Prinztronic, … consoles				4	
PP-820 (208-8 C)	Audiosonic		1980	Netherlands	Pong console		AY-3-8500; AY-3-8760	light gun	8	
Video Play	Aureac VP Electronics		1978	Spain	PC-50x console		In PC-50x cartridges			
Mini 300	Aureac VP Electronics		1980	Spain	Handheld Pong game console				4	
Video Juego Color	Aureac VP Electronics		1978	Spain	clone of Interton 2400		AY-3-8500		5	
TV JACK 5000	Bandai		1978	Japan	PC-50x series console. Beige or blue colored shell		In PC-50x cartridges			old-computers.com ID
TV JACK 3000	Bandai		1977	Japan	Pong console: two race and eight pong games				10	
TV JACK 2500	Bandai		1977	Japan	Home Pong console				4	
TV JACK 1500	Bandai		1977	Japan	Pong console		AY-3-8600		8	
TV JACK 1200	Bandai		1977	Japan	Pong clone console			paddle	4	
TV JACK 1000	Bandai		1977	Japan	Pong console		TMS-1955		4	old-computers.com ID
TV Master Mark II	Bang Bang Electronic Co., Ltd.		1977	Hong Kong	Pong console		AY-3-8500		4	
YQ-1	Beijing's No. 1 Institute of Light Industry		1981	People's Republic of China	Chinese Pong console					
Gamatic 7600	Bemor		1977	United States	Pong console. Identical to Otron console		TMS-1955		4	old-computers.com ID
Compu-Vision 440	Bentley Industries inc.		1983	United Kingdom	Pong console		AY-3-8500		4	old-computers.com ID
Telesport	Bianchi SA		1977	Spain	four game model Pong console		AY-3-8500		4	
Telesport Color 6 juegos	Bianchi SA		1978	Spain	Six games pong console		AY-3-8500		6	
Telesport 5 juegos	Bianchi SA		1978	Spain	handheld Pong console		AY-3-8500		5	
TV Gaming Unit (01-4990)	Binatone		1977	United Kingdom	Pong console, probably discrete TTL		7400 series		1	old-computers.com ID
Cablestar (01-4362)	Binatone		1978	United Kingdom	PC-50x Pong console		In PC-50x cartridges			
TV-Tron (01-4982)	Binatone		1976	United Kingdom	Pong console		AY-3-8500		4	
TV Master Mk IV (01-4974)	Binatone		1977	United Kingdom	In red or orange case		AY-3-8500		4	old-computers.com ID
TV Master 4 plus 2 (01-4869)	Binatone		1977	United Kingdom	Pong console. Lightgun is optional		AY-3-8500	light gun	6	old-computers.com ID
TV Master MK 6 (01-4907)	Binatone		1977	United Kingdom	Pong console		AY-3-8500	light gun	6	old-computers.com ID
TV Master MK 8 (01-4823)	Binatone		1977	United Kingdom	Pong console		AY-3-8610		8	old-computers.com ID
TV Master MK 10 (01-4834)	Binatone		1977	United Kingdom	Pong console. Shooting games are played directly with the analog joysticks		AY-3-8610		10	old-computers.com ID
Colour TV Game (01-4931)	Binatone		1978	United Kingdom	Pong console		AY-3-8500		4	old-computers.com ID
Colour TV Game 4 plus 2 (01-4850)	Binatone		1978	United Kingdom	Pong console. Lightgun is optional		AY-3-8500	light gun	6	old-computers.com ID
Colour TV Game MK 6 (01-4761)	Binatone		1978	United Kingdom	Pong console		AY-3-8500	light gun	6	old-computers.com ID
Colour TV Game MK 10 (01-4842)	Binatone		1978	United Kingdom	Pong console. Shooting games are played directly with the analog joysticks		AY-3-8610		10	old-computers.com ID
Superstar (01-4354)	Binatone		1978	United Kingdom	PC-50x Pong console		In PC-50x cartridges			
TVG-203	Bingo		1977	France	Pong home console		AY-3-8500		4	
Video Game HI-1012	Bingo		1977	France	Pong console		AY-3-8500		4	
TVG-204	Bingo		1977	France	Pong console				3	
TVG-205	Bingo		1977	France	Pong console			light gun	4	
TV Action Color 200	Blaupunkt		1977	Germany	Pong console usable only with Blaupunkt TV sets (PS19).				8	
TV Action Color 100	Blaupunkt		1977	Germany	Pong console usable only with Blaupunkt TV sets		AY-3-8500		4	old-computers.com ID
Telejuego	Blaupunkt		1977	Germany	Pong home console		AY-3-8500		4	
Video Game TVG-8000 Champion 77	BMC		1978	Japan	Pong console			light gun	6	
Video Game TVG-5000	BMC		1976	Japan	Pong console. With six games (a four-game version exists)			light gun	6	
Video Action TVG-9000 Grand Prix 77	BMC		1977	Japan	Pong console; two pong games, two race games				4	
TV Game AU-807	Bonny		1977		Bonny pong console		AY-3-8500		4	
TG100	Boots Audio		1977	United Kingdom	Pong console				4	
Bang 1000	Bowmar		1977	United States	Pong console				4	
Colormate de Luxe	Boyang Electronic corporation		1977	South Korea	Pong console. Four games: tennis, pelota squash, soccer, gun. Two or four players		MPS-7600-001	light gun	4	MobyGames game ID MobyGames game ID (former scheme)
Jeu Video JT 321	Brandt Electronique		1977	France	Pong console				4	
Breamcolor	C&G Electronic		1977	Italy	Pong console				3	
Breamcross	C&G Electronic		1977	Italy	Motorbike games foscused Pong console				4	
Teleplay (Bream Player Special)	C&G Electronic		1977	Italy	1977 video game console model				4	
Odyssee	C. Lorenz AG		1973	Germany	European version of the Magnavox Odyssey. With cartridges		transistor–transistor logic		22	
Nicole 4A8	C.G.M.E. - S.p.a.		1978	Italy	Italian Pong console		In PC-50x cartridges			
Strong Sport TV Game	C.I. CORONA, S.A.		1978	Spain	Pong console		AY-3-8500		4	
TVG 101-4	C.I.C.		1977		Pong console		AY-3-8500		4	
TVG-406-6	C.I.C.		1977		Pong home console			light gun	6	
TVG 201-4	C.I.C.		1977		Pong home console		AY-3-8500		4	
Videosport	C.V.T. Industries Ltd.		1977	New Zealand	Pong console				4	
Lem 2000	Cabel Electronic		1979	Italy	PC-50x series		In PC-50x cartridges			
Telegioca match 1	Cabel Electronic		1977	Italy	Pong console		TMS-1965N		4	
Telegun	Cabel Electronic		1977	Italy	Pong console		AY-3-8500	light gun	6	
Bag-A-Tel Ep-800	Calfax		1977	United States	Pong console		TMS-1955		4	
TVG-872	CAM			Italy	PC-50x series		In PC-50x cartridges			
Video Sports 84-6072	Canadian Tire		1976	Canada	Pong console. VS-1 clone		AY-3-8500		4	
SD-081	Carinco		1977	Denmark	Pong console		AY-3-8610		10	
Video Match	CI-EFFE S.n.c.			Italy	Pong console, sold also as Betron, Milano				4	
Video Gun	CI-EFFE S.n.c.			Italy	Pong console, sold also as Betron, Milano			light gun	6	
Telstar Arcade	Coleco		1977	United States	Pong home console with 4 cartridges		MPS-7600-001; MPS-7600-002; MPS-7600-003; MPS-7600-004	light gun sim racing wheel		old-computers.com ID
Telstar Marksman	Coleco		1978	United States	Dedicated Pong home console		AY-3-8512	light gun	6	old-computers.com ID
Telstar Alpha	Coleco		1977	United States	Four games pong console		AY-3-8500		4	Gaming-History ID old-computers.com ID
Combat!	Coleco		1977	United States	Four tank games console		AY-3-8700		4	old-computers.com ID Gaming-History ID
Telstar Classic	Coleco		1976	United States	Pong Console		AY-3-8500		3	old-computers.com ID Gaming-History ID
Telstar Colortron	Coleco		1978	United States	Pong console		AY-3-8510		4	old-computers.com ID Gaming-History ID; Gaming-History ID old-computers.com ID
Telstar Ranger	Coleco		1977	United States	Video game Pong console		AY-3-8500	light gun	6	old-computers.com ID Gaming-History ID
Telstar Colormatic	Coleco		1977	United States	Video game Pong console		AY-3-8500		4	old-computers.com ID Gaming-History ID
Telstar Gemini	Coleco		1978	United States	Pong console		MPS-7600-004	light gun	6	Gaming-History ID MobyGames game ID MobyGames game ID (former scheme) old-computers.com ID
Telstar	Coleco		1976	United States	Pong console, first of the Coleco Telstar series		AY-3-8500		3	old-computers.com ID Gaming-History ID
Telstar Deluxe	Coleco		1977	United States	Pong home console		AY-3-8500		3	
Telstar Regent	Coleco		1977	United States	Black and white Pong console		AY-3-8500		4	
Telstar Sportsman	Coleco		1978	United States	Pong home console		AY-3-8500	light gun	6	
Telstar Galaxy	Coleco		1977	United States	Video game Pong console. Four players and against the computer modes		AY-3-8600	joystick	8	MobyGames game ID (former scheme) MobyGames game ID
Videosport 4000	Comersa		1977	Spain	Pong console		AY-3-8500	light gun	6	
Videosport Junior	Comersa		1977	Spain	Pong console		AY-3-8500		6; 5	
Videosport 4000 Color	Comersa		1977	Spain	Pong console		AY-3-8500	light gun	6; 4	
Commodore TV Game 2000K	Commodore International		1975	United States	4 games Pong Console		MPS-7600-001	light gun	4	old-computers.com ID
Commodore TV Game 3000H	Commodore International		1977	United States	Pong console		MPS-7600-001	light gun	4	
Spectrum 6 (1025)	Concept 2000		1977	United States	Pong console. Three games for one or two player (3x2=6 variation)		MM-57105N (PAL)		3	old-computers.com ID
Nose T' Nose, 4-way videogame	Concept 2000		1977	United States	Pong console				4	
TV4+ Four-Way Video Game	Concept 2000		1977	United States	Pong console. = OPL Optim TV4+		AY-3-8500		4	
TVG-4	Concept 2000		1977	United States	Pong home console		AY-3-8500		4	
TVG-10	Concept 2000		1977	United States	Pong home console					
TVG-205 colour	Concord		1977	Australia	Pong console			light gun	6	
Tele jeu 6000	Concord		1977	Australia	Pong console		AY-3-8500		4	
Video Game TVG-203	Concord		1977	Australia	Pong console				4	
Programmable TV Game 501	Concord		1978	Australia	PC-50x pong console		In PC-50x cartridges			
TV Sports TG-621	Conic		1977	British Hong Kong	Pong console		AY-3-8500		4	old-computers.com ID
304	Conic		1977	British Hong Kong	Pong console. =Audio TG100		AY-3-8500		4	
TV Sports TG-721	Conic		1977	British Hong Kong	Pong Console		AY-3-8500		3	
TVG 101-4	Conic		1977	British Hong Kong	Pong Console		AY-3-8500		4	
TVG 102-4	Conic		1977	British Hong Kong	Pong Console		AY-3-8500		4	
TVG 201-4	Conic		1977	British Hong Kong	Pong Console		AY-3-8500		4	
TVG 202-4	Conic		1977	British Hong Kong	4 games Pong Console		AY-3-8500		4	
TVG 204-4	Conic		1977	British Hong Kong	4 games Pong Console		AY-3-8500		4	
Heroic Tank	Conic		1977	British Hong Kong	Pong Console with tank games				1	
TVG 209	Conic		1977	British Hong Kong	Pong Console		AY-3-8500		4	old-computers.com ID
Color TV Sports TVG 406	Conic		1977	British Hong Kong	Pong Console		AY-3-8500	light gun	6	
TVG 4010-6	Conic		1977	British Hong Kong	Pong console		AY-3-8500	light gun	6	
Programmable TV Game (MPC-862C)	Conic		1977	British Hong Kong	Pong console. PC-50x series		In PC-50x cartridges			
TVG-SD-01	Conic		1977	British Hong Kong	Pong console		AY-3-8500		4	
4A-8 (9015)	Conic		1978	British Hong Kong	9015 (PC-50x) Pong console		In PC-50x cartridges			
TV Sports DX-702	Conic		1977	British Hong Kong	Pong console		AY-3-8500	light gun	6	
Colour Video Game	Conic		1977	British Hong Kong	Pong console				8	
TVG 268-8 (B&W)	Conic		1978	British Hong Kong	Pong console		AY-3-8600		8	
TVG 468-10	Conic		1978	British Hong Kong	Pong console		AY-3-8610		10	
TVG-846CP	Conic		1977	British Hong Kong	Pong console		AY-3-8500	light gun	6	
TVG-288A	Conic			British Hong Kong	bike race first generation console		AY-3-8760		4	
Convoy 7600	Consolidated Enterprises - Convoy		1977	United Arab Emirates	Pong console. = Gamatic 7600				4	
Convoy 7706	Consolidated Enterprises - Convoy			United Arab Emirates	Pong console			light gun	6	
Jeux Video JV-2703	Continental Edison		1977	France	Pong console		AY-3-8500		6	
Jeux Video JV-2701	Continental Edison		1977	France	Pong console				5	
Jeux Video JV-2705	Continental Edison		1977	France	Pong console				4	
Jeux Video JV-2707	Continental Edison		1977	France	Pong console			light gun	6	
Video Esport	Controlmetric s. a.		1977	Spain	Pong console		TMS-1965N		4	
NovoKit 2015	Controlmetric s. a.		1977	Spain	Pong home console, sold in kit		TMS-1965N		4	
Color TV game 4000c	Cosinus		1977	Germany	Pong console. games in color				4	
Bi.Bip 4	Creatronic		1977	France	Pong console		AY-3-8500		4	
Bi.Bip 8	Creatronic		1977	France	Pong console		AY-3-8600		8	
Bi.Bip 6	Creatronic		1977	France	Pong console		AY-3-8500	light gun	6	
Bi.Bip 100	Creatronic		1978	France	Pong console. Race and pong games			light gun	10	
Program 2000 SD-05	Creatronic		1978	France	PC-50x serie console		In PC-50x cartridges			
Juegos TV color	D.E.S.A.L.		1978	Spain	Pong console		AY-3-8500		4	
TV-Sports 77	Daewoo		1977	South Korea	Pong console. Identical to Univox 4IN				4	
Video Sport	Davitronix		1977	Denmark	Pong console. dava-tronic text presents on the console				4	
7N TV game	Davitronix		1977	Denmark	Pong console				4	
Marumé 2000 (VM-90C)	Dayya Corp.		1977	United States	In red or white case		MPS-7600-001		4	
TV-Games 007	Dazzla		1977	Japan	Pong console				5	
Sport TV Game Colour TG-0062	Decca		1977	United States; United Kingdom	Pong color pong console. optional light gun		AY-3-8500	light gun	6	
Sport TV Game monochrome	Decca		1977	United States; United Kingdom	Black and white Pong console. Optional light gun		AY-3-8500	light gun	6	
Programmable Video Game System	Decca		1977	United States; United Kingdom	PC-50x console		In PC-50x cartridges			
Delta III Videogame	Delta				Video game Pong console					
Deportel	Deportel		1977	Spain	Pong console				4	
Multi Color 777 (777-JS)	Derby Master		1977	United Kingdom	Pong console		NTL-600		3	
TV Game HVG-220	Diasonic		1977	United States	Pong console		AY-3-8500		4	
TV Game Y-1170	Diasonic		1977	United States	Pong console		AY-3-8500			
Y-1170 TV Game	Dick Smith		1977	Australia	Pong console. ≃ Temco T800				4	
Video Ball Game Kit	Dick Smith		1978	Australia	Pong console				11	
Programmable TV Game Console Y-1160	Dick Smith		1978	Australia	PC-50x series. Similar to Soundic SD-050		In PC-50x cartridges			
(V) Difa	Difa		1977	Spain	Metal pong console		AY-3-8500		4	
TV Game 2001	Digitek		1977	United States	Pong console		AY-3-8500		4	
Color TV sports TVG-406-6	DKS		1977	Hong Kong	Pong console			light gun	6	
Tele-Action mini GMT513	DMS - Clayton Group Ltd.		1983	United States	Home Pong console		AY-3-8500		4	
Tele-Sports Mini	DMS - Clayton Group Ltd.		1983	United States	Handheld pong console		AY-3-8500		4	old-computers.com ID
DS-2	DS-2		1977	Spain	Pong console			light gun	6	
Color C4016 Video Games	Duette		1979	Italy	Pong console with two chips		AY-3-8610; AY-3-8760		18	
TV Sport Games EP800	E&P Electronic LTD.		1977	Hong Kong	Pong console. Rebranded by Granada		TMS-1965N		4	
TV Game EP 460	E&P Electronic LTD.		1976	Hong Kong	Pong console. Rebranded by Mecca		AY-3-8500		4	
TV Game EP500	E&P Electronic LTD.		1976	Hong Kong	Pong console rebranded by Granada, Nobility, Mecca, Windsor		AY-3-8500		4	
TV-Ping-Pong (DN76)	EA		1976	Germany	Digital Pong console. One game		7400 series		1	
Hide-Away TV Game	EACA		1977	Netherlands	Pong console		TMS-1965N		4	
TV-Games LU-009	Echo Electronics Corporation		1977	Taiwan	Pong console, identical to Blaupunkt Telejuego		AY-3-8500		4	
Programmable 2003	Elbex		1977		PC-50x series Pong console		In PC-50x cartridges	light gun		
Ping-O-Tronic	Electrolux Italy		1974	Italy	Pong home console		7400 series	light gun	4	
Play-O-Tronic	Electrolux Italy		1977	Italy	Dedicated Pong home console released under the Séleco brand		AY-3-8500	light gun	6	
TV Bol	Electronic Do Brasil		1978	Brazil	Pong console. Sold also by Nacional Elctrnic?				4	
Videosport	Electronika		1981	Soviet Union	Soviet Pong console game		К145ИК17	light gun	6	
Videosport 3	Electronika		1983	Soviet Union	Soviet Pong console game		К145ИК17	light gun	7	
Eksi-Video 01	Electronika		1978	Soviet Union	Russian Pong console		К145ИК17		5	
Leader	Electronika		1993	Soviet Union	Russian Pong console. Can be blue, yellow or black		К145ИК17		5	
Videosport-M	Electronika			Soviet Union	Russian Pong console		К145ИК17			
Eksi-Video 02	Electronika			Soviet Union	Is the same of Eksi-Video 01 plus the presence of a photogun		К145ИК17			
Videosport-2	Electronika			Soviet Union	Pong console		К145ИК17			
Pro-Sports TVG-1001	Electrophonic		1977	United States	Pong console		AY-3-8500		4	
Colour T.V. Games TV 01	Electrosport		1978	United Kingdom	Pong console		MM-57105N (PAL)		3	
Teletrans TV Sport	Elektronal A.Ş.		1979	Turkey	Pong console				4	
TV-Jogo Canal 14	Eletron		1978	Brazil	Brazilian Pong console			light gun	6	
D-5614	Elftone		1977	United Kingdom	Pong console				4	
El-tvg-01	Elftone		1977	United Kingdom	Pong console				4	
El-tvg-02c	Elftone		1977	United Kingdom	Pong console. Can be blue or white				4	
POC-POC 2007	Elpro		1977	Mexico	Mexican pong console		AY-3-8500		4	
Ameprod Television Game 10	Elwro; PPZ Ameprod		1978	Polish People's Republic; Poland	dedicated Pong home console sold from 1980 by PPZ Ameprod		AY-3-8500	light gun	6	
Apollo 2001 Color Home Video Game	Enterprex		1977	United States	Pong console		AY-3-8500		4	
Apollo 2004 Color Home Video Game	Enterprex		1977	United States	Pong console		AY-3-8600		8	
Gameroom Tele-Pong (3047)	Entex Industries		1976	United States	dedicated Pong home console using discrete components (analog and digital)		7400 series		1	old-computers.com ID
TV Game System 10	Epoch Co.		1977	Japan	Pong console, based on NEC μPD770C chip			light gun	10	
TV Tennis Electrotennis	Epoch Co.		1975-09-12	Japan	Pong home console; first Japanese console				1	
TV Block	Epoch Co.		1979	Japan	Pong console by Epoch, clone of Video Pinball (Model C-380) by Atari		C011500-11/C011512-05		7	old-computers.com ID
TV VADER	Epoch Co.		1980	Japan	dedicated first-generation home console				4	old-computers.com ID
TV Baseball	Epoch Co.		1978	Japan	Dedicated home game console				1	old-computers.com ID
Mod.2	ERS: Electronic Readout Systems inc.			Hong Kong	Pong console				4	
TVG 102-4	Evadin		1977	Brazil	Pong console				4	
TVG 101-4	Evadin			Brazil	Evadin pong console				4	
FS-Spiel TVG-204 - 4/8	Exclusiv		1977	Germany	Pong console				4	
TVG-209 - 4	Exclusiv		1977	Germany	Pong console				4	
Color TVG-409 - 4/8	Exclusiv		1977	Germany	Pong console				4	
Television Tennis (035)	Executive Games		1975	United States	Pong console (Analog+Digital)		7400 series		2	
Face Off	Executive Games		1976	United States	Home Pong console		7400 series		2	
TV-Spiel Color 1	Eximec		1977	Germany	Pong console				4	
TV-Spiel Color 2	Eximec		1977	Germany	Pong console		AY-3-8500	light gun	6	
Home Video Game	F.B.M.			Italy	Pong Italian console				4	
T.V. Sport / Video Action	Farad Electronics PTY Ltd.			Australia	Pong console				4	
Federal 7620	Federal				Pong console				4	
Video Sports 76	First Dimension		1976	United States	Pong console. Black and white		AY-3-8500		3	
Video Sports 76c	First Dimension		1976	United States	Pong console. (identical to model 76)		AY-3-8500		3	
Video System FD-3000W	First Dimension		1975	United States	Pong console.Digital (CMOS)		transistor–transistor logic		3	
TV Games Model 100 TV Spiel	FKF		1976	Germany	Pong console				3	
TV-Sport GX4	Friwo Gerätebau GmbH			Germany	Pong console				4	
Sportstron TV-Game (Coca-Cola edition)	Fuji Electric		1977	Japan	Pong console. The dials built-in the system are coke cap shaped		AY-3-8500		3	old-computers.com ID
Furtec 4 (TVG-30)	Furtec		1977	Spain	Metal handheld Pong console		AY-3-8500		4	
Furtec 5	Furtec		1977	Spain	Pong console with canvas bag			light gun	6	
Furtec 6 (TVG-10)	Furtec		1977	Spain	Metal Pong console		AY-3-8500	light gun	6	
Telespo (テレスポ)	GA-Daishin			Japan	Pong console				6	
Telespo Junior (テレスポジュニア)	GA-Daishin			Japan	Pong console				6	
7640	Gemini		1976	United States	Pong console. Same circuit of Heathkit GD-1999		MM-57105N (PAL)		3	
Wonder Wizard (7702)	General Home Products; Magnavox		1976	United States	dedicated Pong home console		AY-3-8500		3	old-computers.com ID
Wonder Wizard, Bulls Eye (7704)	General Home Products		1976	United States	Pong home console		AY-3-8500	light gun	6	
Wonder Wizard, Sharp Shooter (7705)	General Home Products		1976	United States	Pong home console		AY-3-8500	light gun	6	
Wonder Wizard, Scoreboard (7706)	General Home Products		1976	United States	Pong home console		AY-3-8500		4	
WonderWizard (7709)	General Home Products		1977	United States	Potentially unreleased game console		AY-3-8500		4	
Electrosport Colour	Glendearg		1977	United Kingdom	Pong console				3	
Video Olympiad	Glorytone		1976	United States	USA Pong console. Games: tennis, hockey, squash, pratique		AY-3-8500		4	
Video Olympiad Colorama (7701)	Glorytone		1978	United States	Pong pong console		MM-57105N (PAL)		3	
Geti-3220	Gorenje		1977	Slovenia	Pong console		AY-3-8500	light gun	6	old-computers.com ID
Color Video Game TVG-432	Gracia		1977	Spain	Pong console		NTL-600		3	
TV Game R-1800	Gracia		1977	Spain	Pong console		AY-3-8500		4	
Colorsport VIII (CS1818)	Granada Electronics		1978	United States	Dedicated Pong home console		MPS-7600-001	light gun	4	
TV Game EP500	Granada Electronics		1977	United States	Pong console				4	
TV Game EP800	Granada Electronics		1977	United States	Pong console manufactured by E&P Electronic LTD.		TMS-1955		4	
Video Olympiad	Granada Electronics		1976	United States	Pong console		AY-3-8500		4	
Video Sports	Granada Electronics		1976	United States	Pong console		AY-3-8500		4	
TV game color Adman 3000	Grandstand		1977	United Kingdom; New Zealand	Pong color console. Electronic board shows "GAMATIC-7600"		TMS-1965N		4	old-computers.com ID
Sports Centre 5000 Colour	Grandstand		1979	United Kingdom; New Zealand	Pong and motorcycle racing console		AY-3-8500; AY-3-8760	light gun	10	
Sports Centre 6000	Grandstand		1980	United Kingdom; New Zealand	Pong console		AY-3-8610		10	
TVG-3600 1/MKII/MKIII	Grandstand		1979	United Kingdom; New Zealand	Pong console. Four models: base, 1, MKII and MKIII. Different aspect but same games		AY-3-8500	light gun	6	
Adman TVG-2600 MK II	Grandstand		1977	United Kingdom; New Zealand	Pong console		AY-3-8500	light gun	6	
Match of the Day 2000	Grandstand		1977	United Kingdom; New Zealand	Pong console		AY-3-8500		4	
TV Game Adman 2000	Grandstand		1977	United Kingdom; New Zealand	Black and white Pong console. Electronic board shows "GAMATIC-7600"		TMS-1965N		4	old-computers.com ID
Colour Video Sports Centre 4600	Grandstand		1977	United Kingdom; New Zealand	Pong console		AY-3-8600	light gun	6	
Adman Sportsvision TV Game Model 1000	Grandstand		1977	United Kingdom; New Zealand	Pong console				4	
Colour Cartridge SD050	Grandstand		1978	United Kingdom; New Zealand	PC-50x series console		In PC-50x cartridges			
Colour Programmable SD070	Grandstand		1978	United Kingdom; New Zealand	PC-50x series console		In PC-50x cartridges			
Telescore 750	Groupe SEB		1977	France	dedicated Pong home console		TMS-1965N		4	old-computers.com ID
Telescore 751	Groupe SEB		1977	France	Similar to Telescore 750 but with two detachable game controllers				4	
Telescore 752	Groupe SEB		1977	France	Color display. Like the 750 but with two detachable game controllers and a lightgun		AY-3-8500	light gun	6	
Tele Spiel 1	Grundig		1976	Germany	TV plug-in module. Usable only with Grundig TV		AY-3-8500	light gun	6	
Tank Battle	Grundig		1977	Germany	One tank game and four Pong games				5	
Tele Pong IV	GTE General de telecomunicaciones		1976	Mexico	Four player Pong console.games: Tenis, Soccer, Squash, pistola. ≃ Allied's Name of the Game II (A-300)		MPS-7600-001	light gun	4	
Tele Pong	GTE General de telecomunicaciones		1976	Mexico	Pong console. ≃ Allied's Name Of The Game II		MPS-7600-001		4	
Triple Challenge 7701	Gulliver		1976	United States	Pong console		AY-3-8500		3	
BSS 01	Halbleiterwerk Frankfurt (Oder)		1979	German Democratic Republic	Pong game console from the GDR		AY-3-8500		5	old-computers.com ID UVL game ID
SD-070 (programmable TV-game console)	Hanimex		1978	Australia	PC-50x family Pong console, grey scale colors		In PC-50x cartridges			old-computers.com ID
T-338	Hanimex		1979	Australia	Pong home console		AY-3-8500		4	old-computers.com ID
Jeu-Tele Electronique Modèle 7771	Hanimex		1977	Australia	Home Pong console		AY-3-8500		4	old-computers.com ID
Hanimex 666	Hanimex		1978	Australia	Home Pong console		AY-3-8500		4	old-computers.com ID
677	Hanimex		1978	Australia	Pong home console		AY-3-8500	light gun	6	old-computers.com ID
TVG 070C	Hanimex			Australia	PC-50x family Pong console		In PC-50x cartridges			
Electronic TV Game 777	Hanimex		1977	Australia	Pong console		AY-3-8500		4	
7771-P	Hanimex		1977	Australia	Pong console		AY-3-8500	light gun	6	
7771-G	Hanimex		1977	Australia	Black model		AY-3-8500	light gun	6	
888	Hanimex		1977	Australia	Pong console		MPS-7600-001		3	
TV Scoreboard 888G	Hanimex		1977	Australia	Pong console		MPS-7600-001		4	
TVG-801	Hanimex		1977	Australia	Pong console				3	
Programmable TV-game TVG-050C	Hanimex		1978	Australia	PC-50x family Pong console		In PC-50x cartridges			
TVG-8610	Hanimex			Australia	Pong console		AY-3-8610		10	
TVG-8610C	Hanimex			Australia	Pong console		AY-3-8610		10	
TVG-500	Hanimex		1977	Australia	Pong console				4	
TVG 3000	Hanimex		1978	Australia	PC-50x series		In PC-50x cartridges	sim racing wheel		
Colour TV Game 8881	Hanimex		1977	Australia	Pong console			light gun	6	
H-5 Mini Color TV Game	Harvard		1978	United States	Pong console		AY-3-8500		4	
Color TV game (H-11)	Harvard		1978	United States	Pong console: tennis, football, squash, practice				4	
H-1	Harvard		1978	United States	Pong console					
Tank Battle TV Game H-7	Harvard		1977	United States	Pong console. one tank game and four pong games				5	
TVG-406-6	Harvey		1977	British Hong Kong	Harvey Pong console		AY-3-8500	light gun	6	
Video Game TVG 204-4	Harvey		1979	British Hong Kong	Pong console with 4 games		AY-3-8500		4	
GD-1380	Heath Company		1976	United States	Pong console		AY-3-8500	light gun	6	
GD-1999	Heath Company		1976	United States	Pong console		MM-57105N (PAL)		3	
VideoSport MK2	Henry's		1974	United Kingdom	dedicated Pong home console		7400 series		3	
TVG-621	Heru Ellipses		1977	Belgium	Belgian Pong console		AY-3-8500		4	
TV Sport (T-338)	Heru Ellipses		1977	Belgium	Pong console		AY-3-8500		4	
Telematch TV Sports Color video game	HGS Electronic		1977	Germany	Pong console		AY-3-8500	light gun	6	
Telesport	HGS Electronic		1978	Germany	PC-50x series		In PC-50x cartridges			old-computers.com ID
TVG-203	Hit-Go		1977	France	Pong console			light gun	6	
HIT-10	Hit-Go			France	Pong console				10	
Video Game VG-104	Hitachi		1977	Japan	Pong console				4	
Videoalvo (VD-850 A)	HobbyTron		1977	Brazil	Pong console		AY-3-8500	light gun	6	
Videorama	HobbyTron		1978	Brazil	Pong console		AY-3-8500	light gun	6	
TVG 4711-5	Hofman		1978	Germany	Pong console		AY-3-8500; AY-3-8710	paddle	5	
Telecourt HVG-110	Hometronics		1977	United States	Black and white Pong console		AY-3-8500		4	
Telecourt HVG-220	Hometronics		1977	United States	Color Pong console		AY-3-8500		4	
Video-Sports Color (Honeybell-55)	Honeybell		1977	Germany	Pong console		AY-3-8500		4	
TV games	Híradástechnikai Szövetkezet			Hungary	Pong console		AY-3-8500	light gun	6	
Tele-Match Cassette 1	Ideal-Computer		1977	Germany	Pong module console usable only with Telefunken, Grundig, ITT, Graetz, Ingelen TVs		AY-3-8550		4	
Tele-Match Cassette 2	Ideal-Computer		1978	Germany	Pong console usable only with Telefunken, Grundig, ITT, Graetz, Ingelen TVs		AY-3-8600		8	
Tele-Match Cassette 3	Ideal-Computer		1978	Germany	Tank games. Console usable only with Telefunken, Grundig, ITT, Graetz, Ingelen TVs		AY-3-8710		3	
Tele-Match Cassette 4	Ideal-Computer		1978	Germany	Motorcycle games. Console usable only with Telefunken, Grundig, ITT, Graetz, Ingelen TVs		AY-3-8760		4	
Tele-Match Cassette B	Ideal-Computer		1978	Germany	Pong home console		AY-3-8600		8	
Tele-Match Cassette (French, SECAM)	Ideal-Computer		1978	Germany	Pong home console		AY-3-8610		8	
Tele-Match (paddle)	Ideal-Computer		1977	Germany	Pong home console		AY-3-8500		4	
Tele-Match Cassette C	Ideal-Computer		1978	Germany	Pong home console with 3 tank games		AY-3-8710		3	
Tele-Tainment	IEA		1976	Canada	Analog Pong console. Videomaster Olympic clone		transistor–transistor logic		7	
Tele-Tainment II	IEA		1976	Canada	Analog Pong console		transistor–transistor logic		7	
Colorgame	IMC (Intercon Marketing Corporation)		1977	United States	Pong console, black or yellow case			light gun	3	
Tele-sports mini TV Game (XK 400)	Ingersoll		1978	United Kingdom	Identical to Radofin mini		AY-3-8500		4	
XK 600B screenplay	Ingersoll		1978	United Kingdom	Pong home game console		AY-3-8500	light gun	6	
TV Game R-1800, Home TV Set	Ingersoll		1977	United Kingdom	Pong console		AY-3-8500		4	
Colour Match XK-500C	Ingersoll		1978	United Kingdom	Handheld Pong console			light gun	6	
Battle Command XK-1010	Ingersoll		1978	United Kingdom	PC-50x series, equals to Poppy TVG-10		In PC-50x cartridges			
XK 410C Multi-Coloursport	Ingersoll		1977	United Kingdom	Ten games. Two shooting games are played with standard controller(joysticks)		AY-3-8610		10	old-computers.com ID
Programmable Video Console XK-4000	Ingersoll		1978	United Kingdom	PC-50x		In PC-50x cartridges			
GT-10C	Inno-Hit			Japan; Italy	Pong console with pistol.		AY-3-8610		10	
GT-16C	Inno-Hit			Japan; Italy	Pong console; games pre-installed			light gun	6	
GT-20C	Inno-Hit			Japan; Italy	Pong console				10	
GT-4N (Sportron)	Inno-Hit			Japan; Italy	Pong console;games pre-installed		AY-3-8500		6	
GT-66C	Inno-Hit		1977	Japan; Italy	Pong console; games pre-installed		AY-3-8500	light gun	6	
GT-6N	Inno-Hit			Japan; Italy	Pong console;games pre-installed			light gun	6	
Inno Hit (TTL7400 series) Pong console	Inno-Hit		1975	Japan; Italy	transistor–transistor logic integrated circuits pong console		7400 series		3	
Programaster (1125)	Inno-Hit		1977	Japan; Italy	PC-50x family videogame console		In PC-50x cartridges			
Overkal	Inter Electrónica		1973	Spain	Clone of the Magnavox Odyssey. Digital (Trans) and without cartridges: it has 5 button to select the games		diode–transistor logic		7	
TV Games TVS-5	Intercord		1978	Germany	Pong console. Games: Practice, Squash, Hockey, Tennis		AY-3-8500		4	
Telespiel TVS-6	Intercord		1978	Germany	Pong console		AY-3-8500		4	
Color Tank-TV-Spiel (CTVS 11)	Intercord		1977	Germany	Pong home console: one tank game and four pong games				5	
TVS-4 Electronic	Intercord		1977	Germany	Pong console				4	
TV Sport 1004 (D-670/37)	INTerELektronik GmbH (Intel)		1977	Germany	Pong console		TMS-1965N		4	
TV-Super Sport 1006	INTerELektronik GmbH (Intel)		1977	Germany	Pong console			light gun	6	
TV Sport 2004	INTerELektronik GmbH (Intel)		1978	Germany	Pong console		AY-3-8500		4	
TV Sport 3006 (D-713/36)	INTerELektronik GmbH (Intel)		1977	Germany	Pong console			light gun	6	
TV Sport 4010	INTerELektronik GmbH (Intel)		1978	Germany	Pong console. Black and white video		AY-3-8610		10	
TV Sport 5010 (Art.D759/36)	INTerELektronik GmbH (Intel)		1978	Germany	Pong pong console		AY-3-8610		10	
Super Tele-sport (D-688/36)	INTerELektronik GmbH (Intel)		1977	Germany	Pong console		AY-3-8500		4	old-computers.com ID
Monza (D-719/00)	INTerELektronik GmbH (Intel)		1978	Germany	Pong console		F-4301		4	
Grand Prix (D-731/07)	INTerELektronik GmbH (Intel)		1978	Germany	Pong console		F-4301		4	
Universal Tele-Play (D-744/34)	INTerELektronik GmbH (Intel)		1979	Germany	PC-50x Pong console		In PC-50x cartridges			
Colour Pistol TV Game (1165)	Interstate Electronics Ltd.		1977	United Kingdom	Pong console			light gun	6	
Mini TV Game (1102)	Interstate Electronics Ltd.		1977	United Kingdom	Pong console				8	
Mini TV Game (1104)	Interstate Electronics Ltd.		1977	United Kingdom	Pong game		AY-3-8500		4	
Multisport TV Game (1110)	Interstate Electronics Ltd.		1977	United Kingdom	Pong console		AY-3-8610		10	
TVG-1199	Interstate Electronics Ltd.		1977	United Kingdom	Pong console				10	
Pistol TV Game-1160	Interstate Electronics Ltd.		1977	United Kingdom	Black and white display			light gun	6	
Programaster 1125	Interstate Electronics Ltd.		1977	United Kingdom	PC-50x series of consoles		In PC-50x cartridges			
Interton Video 2000	Interton		1975	Denmark; Germany	Pong home console		CMOS		5	
Interton Video 3000	Interton		1976	Denmark; Germany	Pong home console		AY-3-8500	control knob light gun	6	old-computers.com ID
Interton Video 3001	Interton		1977	Denmark; Germany	Pong home console		AY-3-8500	light gun control knob	6	
Video 2400	Interton		1977	Denmark; Germany	Pong home console		AY-3-8500		5	old-computers.com ID
Interton Video 2501	Interton		1977	Denmark; Germany	Pong home console		MM-57105N (PAL)		3	
Interton Video 2800	Interton		1977	Denmark; Germany	Pong home console		F-4301		4	
Club Exclusiv 2000	Interton		1977	Denmark; Germany	Variation of the Interton Video 3000		AY-3-8500	light gun	6	
TVG-888	Irradio		1978	Italy	PC-50x series		In PC-50x cartridges			
Telejeu SD-043	ITMC		1982	France	Pong console		AY-3-8500	light gun	6	
Telejeu 6 jeux SD 017F	ITMC		1977	France	Pong console		AY-3-8610	light gun	6	
SD-040F	ITMC			France	Pong console		AY-3-8610		10	
SD-050	ITMC			France	PC-50x Pong family console		In PC-50x cartridges			
SD 90	ITMC			France	PC-50x Pong series console		In PC-50x cartridges			
Video Sports - Electronic 4-in-1	J. C. Penney		1983	United States	Pong console				4	
T.V. Game	Jet Signal Industries CO.			Taiwan	Taiwan Pong console				4	
Multi-TV-Game HF344	JostyKit		1979	Denmark	Pong console sold as a kit		AY-3-8500		4	old-computers.com ID
Video Computer Games - TV 003	Kind 4		1977	France	Yellow Pong console				4	
Color Video Attack S-560C	Kiyo-Seiwa		1977	Japan	Pong console				5	
Color Video Game (CS? 700)	Kiyo-Seiwa		1977	Japan	Pong console				3	
Electronic Action TV Game Model 200	Kiyo-Seiwa		1977	Japan	Pong console			light gun	6	
Kodak Color Film	Kiyo-Seiwa		1977	Japan	Yellow Pong console, Identical to Video Attack TG-7800				4	
Video Attack 7	Kiyo-Seiwa		1977	Japan	Pong console			light gun	7	
Video Attack TG-7800	Kiyo-Seiwa		1977	Japan	Red Pong console, identifcal to Kodak Color Film				4	
Video Sports (SG-1000)	Kiyo-Seiwa		1977	Japan	Yellow Pong console. Seven games: hockey 1/2, squash, tennis, shooting, rifle 1/2			light gun	7	
TVG-621	Klervox		1978	France	Pong home console		AY-3-8500		4	
Jeu TV - TVG-6	Klervox		1978	France	Pong console		AY-3-8500	light gun	6	
TV Sports - TVG SD-04	Klervox		1978	France	Pong console				10	
SD-050S color	Klervox		1978	France	PC-50x series		In PC-50x cartridges			
Odyssey 2100	Koninklijke Philips NV		1978	Netherlands	Home Pong console		MM-57186N		6	MobyGames game ID (former scheme) old-computers.com ID MobyGames game ID
Odyssey 200	Koninklijke Philips NV		1976	Netherlands	Philips console identical to the Magnavox Odssesy 200		Texas Instruments		3	
Odyssey 2001	Koninklijke Philips NV		1977	Netherlands	Philips color Pong console		MM-57105N (PAL)		3	old-computers.com ID
Tele-Spiel ES 2201	Koninklijke Philips NV		1975	Netherlands	home video game console		CMOS		5	old-computers.com ID
Tele-Spiel ES 2203 Las Vegas	Koninklijke Philips NV		1977	Netherlands	Philips Pong console		AY-3-8500	light gun	6	
Tele-Spiel ES 2204	Koninklijke Philips NV		1977	Netherlands	Philips Pong console		AY-3-8500	light gun	6	
Tele-Spiel ES 2207 Travemünde	Koninklijke Philips NV		1977	Netherlands	Philips Pong console		AY-3-8500		4	
Tele-Spiel ES 2208 Las Vegas super color	Koninklijke Philips NV		1978	Netherlands	Philips Pong console		AY-3-8550	light gun	6	old-computers.com ID
Tele-Spiel ES 2218 Las Vegas	Koninklijke Philips NV		1978	Netherlands	Philips Pong console		AY-3-8600		8	
Videojeu N20	Koninklijke Philips NV		1977	Netherlands	Philips Pong console		AY-3-8500	light gun	6	old-computers.com ID
Videojeu N30	Koninklijke Philips NV		1977	Netherlands	Philips Pong console. Games: jeu de quilles, pelote basque, billard electronique, foot ball, tennis, hand ball		MM-57186N		6	
Odyssey 2000	Koninklijke Philips NV		1977	Netherlands	Philips pong console		AY-3-8500		4	
12B 615-22	Koninklijke Philips NV			Netherlands	TV with a Pong console built-in					
Tele-Multiplay 6000 (825-328)	Körting Radio Werke		1977	Germany	Pong console		TMS-1965N	light gun	6	old-computers.com ID
Tele-Multiplay 4000 (825-301)	Körting Radio Werke		1977	Germany	Pong console				4	
Tele-Multiplay 8000 (825-336)	Körting Radio Werke		1978	Germany	Pong console		AY-3-8600		8	old-computers.com ID
Tele-Multi Play (825/042)	Körting Radio Werke		1977	Germany	Pong console		AY-3-8500		4	
Tele-Multiplay L (825-050)	Körting Radio Werke		1977	Germany	Pong console				4	
Videojuel	Laboratorio Electrónico Hiroshima		1975	Argentina	Argentinian Pong console, clone of Magnavox Odyssey		diode–transistor logic		9	
TV-G	Lael		1976	Italy	Pong console				4	
Programmable TV Game - TVG-868	Lark		1978	Australia	PC-50x series		In PC-50x cartridges			
TG-621	Lark		1977	Australia	Australian Pong console		AY-3-8500		4	
TV Sport	Lark		1978	Australia	Pong console				10	
TV Sport - 6 game	Lark		1978	Australia	Pong console			light gun	6	
2000 T.V. Game	Lasonic		1978	France	Analog Pong console, uses discrete components. Games: tennis, football and squash		transistor–transistor logic		3	
Tele-Jeux TJ-140	Leaphon		1977	France	Pong console				4	
T-338	Legby		1978	British Hong Kong	Hong Kong Pong console		AY-3-8500		4	
TV-Sports 801 (mod.E801)	Lloyd's		1976	United States	Pong console		AY-3-8500		4	
TV-Sports 802 (mod.802)	Lloyd's		1977	United States	Pong console		AY-3-8500	light gun	6	
TV-Sports 813 (mod.813)	Lloyd's		1977	United States	Pong console			light gun	6	
TV Sports 812	Lloyd's		1977	United States	Pong console			light gun	6	
Color TV Game CT-7600CG	Logitec		1978	Japan	Pong console. Gray or woodgrain body				4	
Palestra 02	LORTA		1978	Ukraine	First Soviet Pong console, made with TTL ICs		transistor–transistor logic		5	
Sportsman 2001	Luxor Systems			Sweden	Color Pong console		MM-57105N (PAL)		3	old-computers.com ID
SD-05	Mach		1978	Sweden	PC-50x series		In PC-50x cartridges			
Teleclick	Magiclick		1979	Argentina	Two versions and two cases: one for Argentinian market and one for Spanish market. Use AY-3-8500-7 CPU		AY-3-8500		5	old-computers.com ID
Odyssey	Magnavox		1972-09; 1973; 1974; 1973-10	United States	first commercial home video game console		diode–transistor logic	light gun	22	old-computers.com ID Video Game History Foundation Library subject ID Gaming-History ID Giant Bomb Wiki ID
Odyssey 100	Magnavox		1975	United States	Pong home console		Texas Instruments		2	old-computers.com ID
Odyssey 200	Magnavox		1975	United States	Pong home console. Digital (TI). Tennis, Hockey, Smash		Texas Instruments		3	old-computers.com ID
Odyssey 300	Magnavox		1976	United States	Home Pong console		AY-3-8500		3	old-computers.com ID MobyGames game ID (former scheme) MobyGames game ID
Odyssey 400	Magnavox		1976	United States	Home Pong console. Digital (TI)		Texas Instruments		3	old-computers.com ID
Odyssey 500	Magnavox		1976	United States	Home Pong console. Digital (TI). Three games. The 4° game is soccer, a combination of the "hockey" playfield and "smash" player graphics		Texas Instruments		3	old-computers.com ID
Odyssey 2000	Magnavox		1977	United States	Home Pong console		AY-3-8500		4	MobyGames game ID (former scheme) MobyGames game ID old-computers.com ID Gaming-History ID
Odyssey 3000	Magnavox		1977	United States	Pong Home console		AY-3-8500		4	
Odyssey 4000	Magnavox		1977	United States	Home Pong console		AY-3-8600		8	
Odyssey 4305	Magnavox		1976	United States	Color TV with built-in Pong console				3	
TV Jogo 10	Malitron		1978	Brazil	Pong console				10	
Video Pinball	Maree Electrónica		1977	Spain	Spanish Pong videogame		TMS-1965N		4	
Video Pinball-10	Maree Electrónica		1978	Spain	Pong console		AY-3-8600		10	
Hobby-Kit Video-Sport	Maree Electrónica		1977	Spain	Pong home console		AY-3-8500		4	
Hobby Kit Video-Sport Super Master	Maree Electrónica		1977	Spain	Pong home console		AY-3-8500		6	
TV Sport 2002	Markint		1977	France	In French and English version		AY-3-8500		4	
304 Video Game	Markint		1977	France	Pong console				4	
T1 Tank Heroique	Markint		1977	France	Tank game console				1	
TV-Sport 2001	Markint		1977	France	Pong console				4	
TV-Sport 6002	Markint		1977	France	Pong console			light gun	6	
Tele-Sports	Markint		1977	France	Markint Pong console		AY-3-8500		4	
4A Video Game	Markint		1977	France	Pong console		AY-3-8500		4	
6 (96)	Markint		1977	France	Pong console			light gun	6	
TV Game TVG-901	Maspel		1977		Pong console			light gun	6	
Telemaster T-1200	Master Electronics s. a.		1977	Spain	Pong home console		AY-3-8500	light gun	6	
Telemaster T-1000	Master Electronics s. a.		1979	Spain	Pong home console		AY-3-8550	light gun	6	
Telemaster T-800	Master Electronics s. a.		1977	Spain	Pong console		AY-3-8500		4	
Spectrum 6, Color-fernsehspiel	Match		1977	Germany	Pong console		MM-57105N (PAL)		3	
SD-01	Match		1977	Germany	Pong console. White or woodgrain case		AY-3-8500		4	old-computers.com ID
Match Color (AY-3-8610)	Match		1978	Germany	Pong console		AY-3-8610		10	
Match Color (NTL 600)	Match		1977	Germany	Pong console		NTL-600		3	
Tele-Ball VII	MBO		1977	Germany	dedicated Pong home console released only in Germany		AY-3-8500	light gun	6	old-computers.com ID
Tele-Ball V	MBO		1977	Germany	Pong console		AY-3-8500	light gun	6	
Tele-Ball VIII (0443)	MBO		1978	Germany	Pong console. games: 4 Pong games + 2 shooting games + 2 car racing games		AY-3-8500; F-4301		8	old-computers.com ID
Teleball-Cassetten-System	MBO		1977	Germany	PC-50x series		In PC-50x cartridges			old-computers.com ID
TG-621	MBO		1977	Germany	Pong console		AY-3-8500		4	
Tele-Ball	MBO		1977	Germany	Pong console		AY-3-8500		4	old-computers.com ID
Tele-Ball II	MBO		1977	Germany	Pong console		AY-3-8500		4	old-computers.com ID
Tele-Ball III	MBO		1977	Germany	Black and white Pong console		AY-3-8500		4	old-computers.com ID
Tele-Ball IV	MBO		1977	Germany	Color Pong console		TMS-1955		4	old-computers.com ID
Tele-Ball VI	MBO		1977	Germany	Pong console				8	
Tele-Ball IX	MBO		1978	Germany	Color games Pong console		AY-3-8610		10	old-computers.com ID
Teleball-Cassetten-System II	MBO		1978	Germany	PC-50x series		In PC-50x cartridges			
EP-460	Mecca		1976	United States	Pong console		AY-3-8500		4	
EP-500	Mecca		1976	United States	Pong console				4	
Colour TV Game	Mentor		1977	United Kingdom	Home Pong console		AY-3-8500		4	
Sport TG 20	Mentor		1977	United Kingdom	Pong console		AY-3-8500		4	old-computers.com ID
Tele-Sports	Mentor		1977	United Kingdom	Mentor Pong console		AY-3-8500		4	
Colour 6 TV Game	Mentor		1977	United Kingdom	Pong console			light gun	6	
Colour 10 TV Game	Mentor		1977	United Kingdom	Pong console				10	
Commander	Mercury		1977	United Kingdom	PC-50x series		In PC-50x cartridges			
Commander Mark III	Mercury		1978	United Kingdom	PC-50x series		In PC-50x cartridges			
Mec TV Games TVG 1000	Mestron		1976	Germany	Pong console				3	
Fernseh Spiel TVG 2006	Mestron		1976	Germany	Pong console. Analog (TTL/Transistor)		7400 series		6	
Hammerstein TV Games (Model no 702)	Metlionics [Pty] Ltd		1977	South Africa	Pong console		AY-3-8500	light gun	7	
Color Game GMC-802	Miragame		1982	Germany	Pong console		M-588315	light gun	8	old-computers.com ID
GM-402	Miragame		1977	Germany	Pong console		AY-3-8500		4	
Video Sporter GXL-4	Monarch		1978	Netherlands	Pong console				4	
Video Sporter XTL-4	Monarch		1978	Netherlands	Pong console				4	
Video Sporter CTX-4 Color	Monarch		1978	Netherlands	Pong console				4	
CTX-2000 programmable video computer	Monarch		1978	Netherlands	PC-50x series		In PC-50x cartridges			
Video Sporter	Monarch		1978	Netherlands	Pong console				4	
TV Sport 825	Monteverdi			United States	Pong console			light gun	6	
Video World Of Sports	Montgomery Ward		1977	United States	Coleco Telstar Deluxe sold by Montgomery Ward for Canadian market		AY-3-8500		3	
TV Game T-800	Mostone		1977	Netherlands	Netherland pong console (made in Hong Kong)		AY-3-8500		4	
TV Game	Mostone		1977	Netherlands	Netherland handhelp pong console (made in Hong Kong)				4	
Hide Away Colour TV game (model 5229)	Mostone		1977	Netherlands	Netherland pong console (made in Hong Kong)				4	
Multi-Play 3300	Music Leader		1977	Germany	Pong console				4	
9012 Color video game	Mustang		1977	Germany	Pong console		AY-3-8500	light gun	6	
9009 Video game	Mustang		1977	Germany	Pong console		AY-3-8500		4	
9008	Mustang		1977	Germany	Pong console		AY-3-8500		4	
9014 Panzerschlacht	Mustang		1977	Germany	Pong home console. one tank game and four pong games				5	
9015	Mustang		1977	Germany	PC-50x series		In PC-50x cartridges			
Electronic TV Game Centre model 15	Mylfro				Pong console		AY-3-8500	light gun	6	
Home Video Game (TP-1000E)	National		1977		Pong console		AY-3-8500		4	
Adversary 370	National Semiconductor		1976	United States	Pong console		MM-57105N (PAL)		3	
NV1001	Neutron		1977		Pong console			light gun	10	
NV404 video game	Neutron		1977		Pong console; games pre-installed				4	
Color TV-Game 15	Nintendo		1977	Japan	Pong console with eight games. Only seven of them for one or two players: 7 x 2 + 1 = 15 variation.		M58816P		8	MobyGames game ID (former scheme) MobyGames game ID
Color TV-Game 6	Nintendo		1977	Japan	Pong console with three games for one or two players: 3 x 2 = 6 variation		M58816P		3	old-computers.com ID The Video Games Museum system ID The Video Games Museum system ID
Color TV Game Block Breaker	Nintendo		1979	Japan	Breakout home dedicated console		M58821P		6	
Color TV-Game Racing 112	Nintendo		1978-06-08	Japan	Pong console with 112 combinations of games, not 112 games				112	old-computers.com ID
Computer TV-Game	Nintendo		1980	Japan	Othello/Reversi home dedicated console				4	
Micro 14 14NT320	Noblex Argentina			Argentina	14-inch TV and Pong console		AY-3-8500		3	
Colour TV Game H-906	Norda		1977	British Hong Kong	Pong console			light gun	6	
TV Game H-915	Norda		1977	British Hong Kong	Pong console				4	
TV Game H-925	Norda		1977	British Hong Kong	Pong console			light gun	6	
TV Game TG-621	Norda		1977	British Hong Kong	Pong console				4	
Nesa Pong	Novedades Electrónicas S.A.		1976	Mexico	Color or B/W Pong console. Case can be white or black, in plastic or metal		MM-57105N (PAL); MM-5789N		3	
Colour Video Sports Game TV 9006	Novex		1977	Netherlands	Pong console		NTL-600		3	
TV-9005	Novex		1977	Netherlands	Pong console				4	
TV game TV-9010-C	Novex		1977	Netherlands	Handheld Color Pong console		AY-3-8500		4	
Computerized Electronic Programmable Video Game 1010	Novex		1978	Netherlands	PC-50x series (9015 cartridge format)		In PC-50x cartridges			
video sports (TJ-142)	Novoton		1977	France	Pong console		AY-3-8500		4	old-computers.com ID
TJ-141	Novoton		1977	France	Pong console		AY-3-8500		4	old-computers.com ID
Optim Sport T-338	OPL			United Kingdom	Pong console				4	
Optim Sport (Mark I)	OPL		1977	United Kingdom	Pong console		AY-3-8500		4	
Optim TV Sport TVG-203	OPL		1977	United Kingdom	Handheld Pong console		AY-3-8500	light gun	6	
Optim TV4+ Four-Way Video Game	OPL		1977	United Kingdom	Pong console. Identical to Concept 2000 TV4+		AY-3-8500		4	
Optim 600 colour	OPL		1978	United Kingdom	PC-50x series		In PC-50x cartridges			
Optim Sport "T" TV Sport	OPL		1977	United Kingdom	Optim Pong console		NTL-600		3	
PP-2000	Orelec		1976	France	Pong console. Analog (TTL)		transistor–transistor logic		2	
Sportronic	Osborne Professional Electronics		1977	New Zealand	Early game console made in New Zealand			light gun	6	
Gamatic 7706 (model with reset and serve on the controllers)	Otron		1977	Korea	Pong console		TMS-1965N	light gun	6	
Gamatic 7706 (model with reset and serve on the console body)	Otron		1978	Korea	Pong console		AY-3-8500	light gun	6	
Gamatic 7600	Otron		1978	Korea	Pong console. similar to Otron Gamatic 7600		AY-3-8500		4	
Gamatic 7600	Otron		1977	Korea	console model		TMS-1955		4	
Gamatic 7704	Otron		1977	Korea	Pong console				4	
Gamatic 8600 Programmable Video Game	Otron			Korea	PC-50x series		In PC-50x cartridges			
TV Sport	Packet Instrument		1976	Australia	Australian Pong console		AY-3-8500		4	
Tele-Match 4000 (825-131)	Palladium		1977	Germany	Pong console		AY-3-8500		4	
Tele-Match 6000 (825-166)	Palladium		1977	Germany	Games: tennis, fussball, squash, pelota, tontauben, treibjagd		AY-3-8500	light gun	6	
Tele-Cassetten-Game Color (825-530)	Palladium		1978	Germany	PC-50x series		In PC-50x cartridges			old-computers.com ID
Tele-Cassetten-Game Color (825-581)	Palladium		1978	Germany	PC-50x series		In PC-50x cartridges			old-computers.com ID
Tele-Match (825-182)	Palladium		1977	Germany	Pong console, games in black and white			light gun	6	
Tele-Match (825-425)	Palladium		1977	Germany	Pong console, color games			light gun	6	
Tele-Match (825-468)	Palladium		1977	Germany	Pong console. Black and white games		AY-3-8500		4	
Tele-Match Color (825-344)	Palladium		1977	Germany	Pong console. color games			light gun	6	
Tele-Match Color (825-452)	Palladium		1977	Germany	Pong console, Rifle and Pistol included			light gun		
Tele-Match Color (825-484)	Palladium		1977	Germany	Pong game. color games				4	
Tele-Multiplay SR (825-417)	Palladium		1977	Germany	Pong console				12	old-computers.com ID
Polygame Tele-Match	Palladium		1977	Germany	Pong color game console			light gun	6	
Tele-Match Color R (825-352)	Palladium		1977	Germany	Pong game			light gun	6	
Tele-Multiplay R (825-387)	Palladium		1977	Germany	Four Pong, two shooting and two race games			light gun	8	
CX.302	Palson		1977	Spain	In different colors. Also Marie Claire and Mister Kler Promotional Edition		AY-3-8500		4	
CX-303	Palson		1977	Spain	Pong console. in different colors		MM-57105N (PAL)		3	
CX.306 Super 10 Color	Palson		1977	Spain	Console in different colors		AY-3-8610		10	
CX.340	Palson		1978	Spain	In different colors		AY-3-8500		4	
CX-336 Game Cassette System	Palson			Spain	PC-50x series console		In PC-50x cartridges			
Telematch (J5)	Panoramic		1976-09	Argentina	Pong console, clone of Magnavox Odyssey		diode–transistor logic		5	
Telematch Junior	Panoramic		1977	Argentina	Pong console				5	
Telematch Nuclear	Panoramic		1977	Argentina	Pong console			light gun	6	
Parat XY-4	Parat		1977	Denmark	Pong console				4	
Parat TV Sport (XY 11)	Parat		1977	Denmark	Pong console				4	
Jeu Video JV1V	Pathé-Marconi		1977	France	Pong console				5	
Jeu Video JV2V	Pathé-Marconi		1977	France	Pong console				6	
Jeu Video JV402V	Pathé-Marconi		1977	France	Pong console				4	
Jeu Video JV602V	Pathé-Marconi		1977	France	Pong console				6	
TVG-4	Peak Power		1978		Pong home console		AY-3-8500		4	
Telejogo	Philco		1977	United States	Pong console by Philco-Ford		MM-57105N (PAL)		3	
Telejogo II	Philco		1979	United States	Pong home console		AY-3-8610		10	
Zonk	Phone-Mate inc.		1977	United States	Pong console				4	
Teleflipper	Phonola		1978	Italy	Pong color console. Rebranded version of Philips Odyssey 2100		MM-57186N		6	
Telesport TV Games	Playtech		1976	Australia	Pong console		AY-3-8500		4	old-computers.com ID
TV Sport	Plovdiv		1986	Bulgaria	Bulgarian pong console		AY-3-8500		5	
Video Games V.G.2	Polistil		1978	Italy	Pong console		TMS-1965N		4	old-computers.com ID
PG-7 Programmable TV Games	Polycon		1978	United Kingdom	Polycon Pong game of PC-50x family		In PC-50x cartridges			old-computers.com ID
C4003 (52078-02 MEGA, 52044)	Polycon		1977	United Kingdom	Pong console. C4003 (colors), 4003 (B/W)		TMS-1965N	light gun	6	
C4002	Polycon		1977	United Kingdom	C4002 (color) or 4002 (B/W)		AY-3-8500		4	
C-4016 (52074 MEGA)	Polycon		1979	United Kingdom	Ten Pong and eight motor-cycle games console		AY-3-8610; AY-3-8760		18	
C-4010	Polycon		1978	United Kingdom	Polycon Pong console		AY-3-8610		10	
Tele-spiel 9009	Poppy		1977	Germany	Poppy Pong console		AY-3-8500		4	
Colour Video Game 9012	Poppy		1982	Germany	German Poppy console		AY-3-8500	light gun	6	
TVG-10	Poppy			Germany	German Poppy Pong console.PC-50x series		In PC-50x cartridges			
9017 Colour TV Game	Poppy			Germany	German Poppy Pong console. games: pong + race		AY-3-8512; AY-3-8760		10	old-computers.com ID
TVG-3	Poppy			Germany	German Poppy Pong console. ≈ Conic TG-721				3	
TV-Game Fernseh Spiel TVG-4	Poppy		1978	Germany	German Poppy Pong console		AY-3-8500		4	
Poppy 9015	Poppy			Germany	German Poppy Pong console. PC-50x family		In PC-50x cartridges			old-computers.com ID
Jeux TV	Prim 6 Video		1977	France	Pong console		AY-3-8500		7	old-computers.com ID
Tournament TV Game Electronic (VM8)	Prinztronic		1976	United Kingdom	Pong console		AY-3-8500	light gun	6	
Micro 10 ("Micro Ten" on box)	Prinztronic		1977	United Kingdom	Pong console without cartridge				10	
Videosport 600 - Electronic TV Game	Prinztronic		1978	United Kingdom	Black and white Pong console		AY-3-8500	light gun	6	old-computers.com ID
Videosport 800 - colour electronic TV game	Prinztronic		1978	United Kingdom	Colour Pong console		AY-3-8500	light gun	6	
Tournament IV	Prinztronic			United Kingdom	Pong console. two models: six games with lightgun or four games			light gun	6	
Tournament Colour Programmable TV Game 2000	Prinztronic		1977	United Kingdom	PC-50x Pong console		In PC-50x cartridges			
Micro 5500	Prinztronic		1978	United Kingdom	PC-50x console		In PC-50x cartridges			old-computers.com ID
Grandprix	Prinztronic		1978	United Kingdom	PC-50x console.		In PC-50x cartridges			
Tournament 6 Colour TV Game	Prinztronic		1977	United Kingdom	Pong console			light gun	6	
Tournament Colour Programmable 5000	Prinztronic		1978	United Kingdom	PC-50x console		In PC-50x cartridges			
Tournament II De Luxe	Prinztronic		1977	United Kingdom	Pong console. Two variants: white with six games and lightgun or black with four games		AY-3-8500	light gun	6	
Tournament III (de luxe) - colour electronic TV game	Prinztronic		1977	United Kingdom	Pong console			light gun	6	
Tournament Mini	Prinztronic		1977	United Kingdom	Handheld		AY-3-8500		4	
Tournament Ten - Colour de luxe video TV game	Prinztronic		1979	United Kingdom	Pong console		AY-3-8610		10	
SD-05 Programmable TV-game	Punto Rojo		1978	Spain	PC-50x Pong console		In PC-50x cartridges			
Electronic Color TV Game Q-376	QuadTronics		1977	United States	dedicated Pong-style video game console released in 1976				4	
Electronic Color TV Game Q-476	QuadTronics		1977	United States	Pong console				4	
9010 Video Game	R10		1977	Germany	Pong console, black or gray case. Games: tennis, hockey, squash, hand ball		AY-3-8500		4	old-computers.com ID
9012 Color TV sports	R10		1977	Germany	German Pong console			light gun	6	
Jeu electronic televise TO 2	Radiola		1977	France	Pong console by Radiotechnique. Rebranded Philips N20		AY-3-8500	light gun	6	
Jeu electronic televise TO 3	Radiola		1977	France	Pong console by Radiotechnique. Rebranded Philips Videojeu N30		MM-57186N		6	
TV Scoreboard 60-3051	RadioShack		1976	United States	Tandy/RadioShack Pong console		AY-3-8500		4	
TV Scoreboard 60-3052	RadioShack		1976	United States	Tandy/RadioShack Pong console		AY-3-8500		4	
TV Scoreboard 60-3055	RadioShack		1977	United States	Tandy/RadioShack Pong console		MM-57105N (PAL)		3	
TV Scoreboard 60-3056	RadioShack		1977	United States	Tandy/RadioShack Pong console		AY-3-8500		4	
TV Scoreboard 60-3057	RadioShack		1977	United States	Tandy/RadioShack Pong console. Games: Tennis, Hockey, target, squash		MPS-7600-001	light gun	4	
TV Scoreboard 60-3060	RadioShack		1977	United States	Pong handheld Black & white console		AY-3-8500		4	
TV Scoreboard 60-3061	RadioShack		1977	United States	Tandy/RadioShack portable Pong console		AY-3-8500	light gun	6	old-computers.com ID
TV games	Rado Sonic			Australia	Pong console. Identical to Conic console		AY-3-8500		4	
Most Exciting Home Video Game	Rado Sonic			Australia	Identical to Conic TVG-102-4		AY-3-8500		4	
tele-sports III	Radofin		1978	United Kingdom	Pong console of PC-50x family		In PC-50x cartridges			
Tele-sports IV	Radofin		1981	United Kingdom	Pong console of PC-50x family		In PC-50x cartridges			
Tele-sports mini	Radofin		1977	United Kingdom	Pong console		AY-3-8500		4	
K-Mart SC Eight Thousand (SC8000)	Radofin		1977	United Kingdom	Pong console, sold by K-Mart		MPS-7600-001	light gun	4	
Tele-Sports (4 games model)	Radofin		1977	United Kingdom	Pong console. two versions: black case and fake wooden		AY-3-8500		4	old-computers.com ID
Colour TV Game (Telesports)	Radofin		1981	United Kingdom	Pong console. Ten pong games		AY-3-8610		10	
K-Mart TV Electronic S Four Thousand S4000	Radofin		1977	United Kingdom	Pong console, sold by K-Mart				4	
Electronic TV Game Tele-sport 10 (color)	Radofin			United Kingdom	Pong console. Ten pong games				10	
Jeux video 3011	Radofin			United Kingdom	Pong console		AY-3-8500		4	
Sport-Action TV Game	Radofin			United Kingdom	Pong console			light gun	6	
Tele-Sports (6 games model)	Radofin		1977	United Kingdom	Six games pong console		AY-3-8500	light gun	6	
Brown Box	Ralph H. Baer		1968		Prototype of the Magnavox Odyssey		diode–transistor logic	light gun		
Giochi TV6 403	Re-El		1977	Italy	Color screen		MM-57105N (PAL)		3	
Giochi TV4 401	Re-El		1977	Italy	Console can be red, green or black. Black and white video				4	
Giochi TV 402	Re-El		1977	Italy	Six games. Two with rifle. Black and white			light gun	6	
Giochi TV ART.0400/0412	Re-El		1977	Italy	PC-50x family		In PC-50x cartridges			
TV game (t-338/au-807)	Regent		1977	British Hong Kong	Pong console		AY-3-8500		4	
T-338 TV game	Regina		1977	United Kingdom	Pong console		AY-3-8500		4	
T-800	Regina		1977	United Kingdom	Pong home console		AY-3-8500		4	
10 Exciting Games (T-110 C)	Regina		1977	United Kingdom	Color TV pong console		AY-3-8600	light gun joystick	10	
Colour TV Game, T-338C	Regina		1977	United Kingdom	Color TV pong console		AY-3-8500		4	
R-250 Color TV game	Regina		1977	United Kingdom	Triangular pong console				4	
R-1800	Regina		1977	United Kingdom	B/W triangular pong console				4	
TV Colour Game T-104C	Regina		1977	United Kingdom	Pong console		AY-3-8500		4	
Pong & Tank (T-5081A)	Regina		1978	United Kingdom	Pong home console		AY-3-8500; AY-3-8710	light gun	7	
Richin Pong	Richin		1976	Germany	Pong console				4	
TVG 2006 TV Games	Richin		1976	Germany	Pong analog console		7400 series		6	
8 Electronic TV Game (MT-1A8)	Ricochet Electronics		1977	United States	Pong console		AY-3-8600		8	
Electronic Color TV Game Center (MT-1A)	Ricochet Electronics		1976	United States	Pong console		AY-3-8500		4	
Formula 500 (MT-5A)	Ricochet Electronics		1976	United States	Pong console		F-4301		4	
Super Pro (MT-4A)	Ricochet Electronics		1977	United States	Pong console		SN76410N		6	
Gamatic 7600	Ridgewood		1977	United States	Pong console		SN76410N		4	
T-800	Riva		1977	United Kingdom	Pong console		AY-3-8500		4	old-computers.com ID
TV game T-338	Riva		1977	United Kingdom	Pong console		AY-3-8500		4	
Paddle IV	Roberts		1976	USA	Pong console		AY-3-8500		4	old-computers.com ID
Paddle VI	Roberts		1976	USA	Pong console			light gun	6	
Rally IV	Roberts		1977	USA	Pong console		AY-3-8500		4	old-computers.com ID
Rally X	Roberts		1977	USA	Pong console		MPS-7600-001		8	
Volley VI	Roberts		1977	USA	Pong console			light gun	6	
Sportrama 8 (36)	Roberts		1977	USA	Pong console		AY-3-8600		8	
Super Color Volley X	Roberts		1977	USA	Pong console			light gun	4	
Super Color Video X	Roberts		1977	USA	Pong console			light gun	4	
Robot or Robot OC 5000	Rollet		1978	France	Pong console by RIL (Rollet International Limited)		AY-3-8500	light gun	6	old-computers.com ID
Robot 4302	Rollet		1978	France	Pong console		AY-3-8500	light gun	6	
Video Secam System 4-303	Rollet		1977	France	PC-50x series		In PC-50x cartridges			old-computers.com ID
TV Game Centre (15)	Ronex Computer AB		1977	Sweden	Pong console			light gun	6	
TV-Spill - 2 pistols Colour	Ronex Computer AB		1977	Sweden	Pong console			light gun	6	
SD-050 Programmable Video Game	APG		1978	European Union	PC-50x family videogame console		In PC-50x cartridges			
Black Point Multicolor FS 1001	S.H.G. GmbH		1978	West Germany	Pong console; games pre-installed				4	
Black Point 10 - Tele Sports FS 1002	S.H.G. GmbH		1978	West Germany	Pong console		AY-3-8610		10	
Black Point FS 1003	S.H.G. GmbH		1978	West Germany	PC-50x series as the FS 2000		In PC-50x cartridges			old-computers.com ID
Black Point FS 2000	S.H.G. GmbH		1978	West Germany	PC-50x series as the FS-1003		In PC-50x cartridges			old-computers.com ID
TV8 Sports	Saft		1978	France	Pong console		AY-3-8610		8	old-computers.com ID
Playmaster	Salora		1977	Finland	TV and Pong console				5	
GM-402	Samdo		1977	Netherlands	Pong console, black or white body		AY-3-8500		4	
VG-6512 BW	Sampo			Taiwan	TV and pong console		AY-3-8500		4	
Starex 502 Jeux video	Samsung Electronics		1978	South Korea	Pong console		TMS-1965N	light gun	6	old-computers.com ID
Starex 501 Jeux video	Samsung Electronics		1978	South Korea	Pong home console		TMS-1965N		4	
Color TV Game C-2600	Sands TM		1978	United States	Pong console. games with rifle		AY-3-8500	light gun	6	
TV Game C-2200	Sands TM		1977	United States	Pong console				4	
Colour TV Game C-2300	Sands TM		1977	United States	Pong console				4	
Color TV Game C-2500 UHF	Sands TM		1977	United States	Color Pong console				4	
TV Game C-3000	Sands TM		1977	United States	Pong console				4	old-computers.com ID
Home T.V. Video Game TG-101	Santron Electronis Co. Ltd.		1977	Taiwan	Pong console		AY-3-8500		4	
9015 Color-Cassetten	Sanwa		1977	Germany	PC-50x family (9015 cartridge format)		In PC-50x cartridges			old-computers.com ID
9012 Color Video Game	Sanwa		1977	Germany	Pong console			light gun	6	
Tele-spiel 9009	Sanwa		1977	Germany	Pong console				4	
Télélude	Schneider		1978	France	Rebranded Philips N20		AY-3-8500	light gun	6	old-computers.com ID
Telelude NB2	Schneider		1978	France	Pong console. Rebranded Philips N30		MM-57186N		6	
4 Sports Tele	Scomark		1978	France	Pong console; four games pre-installed		TMS-1965N		4	
8 Sports Tele	Scomark		1978	France	Pong console				8	
10 Sports Tele	Scomark		1978	France	Pong console				10	
jeu TV TVG-6	Scomark		1978	France	Pong console			light gun	6	
Tele-Games Pong (model 25796)	Sears		1975	United States	Pong console		3659-1C/C2566		1	old-computers.com ID
Tele-Games Pinball Breakaway (99713)	Sears		1977	United States	Atari console licensed to Sears		C011500-11/C011512-05		7	old-computers.com ID
Tele-Games Super Pong (99736)	Sears		1976	United States	Sears Pong console developed by Atari		C010073-3		4	
Tele-Games Motocross Sports Center IV (99729)	Sears		1977	United States	Twenty games: sixteen Pong, four race. Only the four race games are presents on the Atari Stunt Cycle (C-450)		AY-3-8760; C010765		20	
Tele-Games Gunslinger II	Sears		1978	United States	Developed by Coleco, licensed to Sears			light gun	6	
Tele-Games 80007	Sears		1978	United States	Pong console				4	
Tele-Games Hockey-Jokari	Sears		1977	United States	Pong console licensed to Sears by APF				4	
Tele-Games Hockey-Pong (99721)	Sears		1976	United States	Pong console by Atari and licensed to Sears		AY-3-8500		4	
Tele-Games Hockey-Tennis (99722)	Sears		1977	United States	APF Pong console licensed to Sears		AY-3-8500		4	
Tele-Games Hockey-Tennis II (99733)	Sears		1977	United States	APF Pong console licensed to Sears		AY-3-8500		4	
Tele-Games Hockey-Tennis III (99734)	Sears		1977	United States	APF Pong console licensed to Sears		AY-3-8500		4	
Tele-Games Speedway S-100 (99747)	Sears		1978	United States	Pong console		F-4301		4	
Tele-Games Speedway (80017)	Sears		1978	United States	Pong console: two Pong and two race games		F-4301		4	
Tele-Games Speedway IV (99748)	Sears		1978	United States	Atari console licensed to Sears.		F-4301		4	
Tele-Games Pong Sports II (99707)	Sears		1977	United States	Atari Pong console licensed to Sears		C010765		16	
Tele-Games Pong Sports IV (99708)	Sears		1977	United States	Atari console licensed to Sears		C010765		16	
Tele-Games Pong IV (99717)	Sears		1975	United States	Atari Pong console licensed to Sears		3659-3		1	
Tele-Games Super Pong IV (99737)	Sears		1976	United States	Atari console licensed to Sears (pedestral case)		C010073-01/C2607		4	
Tele-Games Super Pong IV (99789)	Sears		1977	United States	Atari console licensed to Sears (flat case).		C010073-01/C2607		10	
Secam Systeme Vidéo Cassettes	Secam		1978	France	Pong home console		In PC-50x cartridges			
Jeu Video SD-050S	Secam		1978	France	Pong console		In PC-50x cartridges			
TV Game TVG-96 Coleur	Sennheiser		1977	Germany	Pong console		AY-3-8500	light gun	6	
СУ-А	Shanghai Chunlei Electronic Instrument Factory		1980	People's Republic of China	Chinese Pong console				4	
TV Game T-338	Sharleen		1977	United Kingdom	Sharleen UK pong console				4	
Video Game (D5614)	Sharleen		1977	United Kingdom	Pong home console		AY-3-8500		4	
Video Sport Game	Sharp Corporation		1977	Japan	Pong console				4	
4 Sport EP-800	Sharp Corporation		1977	Japan	Pong console				4	
Color TV Game	Sharp Corporation		1977	Japan	Nintendo Color TV Game 6 licensed to Sharp		M58816P		3	
4711 Most Exciting Tank Battle	Sheen		1977	Australia	One tank game and four Pong games				5	
Video Sport 104	Sheen		1977	Australia	Pong console		AY-3-8500		4	
Colour Video Sport 106C	Sheen		1977	Australia	Pong console		AY-3-8500	light gun	6	
Color TV Sports TVG-406-6	Sheen		1977	Australia	Pong console		AY-3-8500	light gun	6	
TVG-201	Sheen		1977	Australia	Light gray Pong console		AY-3-8500		4	
Video Game TVG-202	Sheen		1977	Australia	Black Pong console		AY-3-8500		4	
TVG-468-10	Sheen		1977	Australia	Pong console				10	
Video-Sport 100	Sheen		1977	Australia	Pong game			light gun	6	
9015	Sheen		1978	Australia	PC-50x series (9015 cartridges)		In PC-50x cartridges			
Bildmeister Turnier FZ 2001	Siemens		1977	Germany	Pong console. Similar to Blaupunkt TV Action Color 100. AV module included to be installed into the TV		AY-3-8500		4	
Telegioco	Silcom		1977	Italy	Pong console, identical to Re-El Giochi TV4 401		AY-3-8500		4	
Telegioco Color	Silcom		1977	Italy	Pong console with color games		MM-57105N (PAL)		3	
Telegame 2001	Silora		1977	Israel	Pong console with wood case			light gun	6	
IC VG-8-C	Single		1977	Spain	Pong console		AY-3-8600		8	
T.V. Game	Sinoca		1978	United States	Pong console		AY-3-8500		4	
C-2600 Colour	Sipo			Germany	Pong console			light gun	6	
TV Spiel Color SD-050	Sipo		1978	Germany	PC-50x series		In PC-50x cartridges			
Sixplay	Sixplay		1979	France	Pong console		AY-3-8500	light gun	6	old-computers.com ID
video-sports 124	Skylark		1977	Germany	Pong console		AY-3-8500		4	
Occitel	Société occitane d'électronique		1975	France	Société Occitane d'Electronique (SOE) Pong console		AY-3-8500		4	
OC 5000	Société occitane d'électronique		1978	France	Société Occitane d'Electronique (SOE) Pong console		AY-3-8500	light gun	6	old-computers.com ID
OC4	Société occitane d'électronique		1976	France	Société Occitane d'Electronique (SOE) Pong console		AY-3-8500		4	old-computers.com ID
Match Junior/Robot - Occitel 2	Société occitane d'électronique		1977	France	Société Occitane d'Electronique (SOE) Pong console		TMS-1965N		4	
Occitel 003 Jeu Video Modulaire	Société occitane d'électronique		1977	France	PC-50x series Pong console		In PC-50x cartridges			
OC 6000	Société occitane d'électronique		1979	France	Société Occitane d'Electronique (SOE) Pong console		AY-3-8610		8	old-computers.com ID
OC 7000 Bataille de Tanks	Société occitane d'électronique		1979	France	Société Occitane d'Electronique (SOE) tank console		AY-3-8700		4	
406-6 Color TV Sports Video Game	Sonico		1977	Germany	Pong console		AY-3-8512	light gun	6	old-computers.com ID
BTVG-JM888	Sonix		1977	United Kingdom	Pong console			light gun	6	
Hide-away TV Game	Sonnesta		1977	Germany	Pong console		TMS-1965N	light gun	6	
Telematch	Sonolor		1977	France	Black and white Pong console. Score displayed on the screen BUT equipped with sliders marked from 0 to 10 to keep the general score		AY-3-8500		4	old-computers.com ID
Video game SD-01 (TV sport) (6 games model)	Soundic		1977	Hong Kong	Hong Kong Soundic Pong console. Blue and white or black and white		AY-3-8500	light gun	6	
SD-04 (SD-040V) TV Sports (colour)	Soundic		1977	Hong Kong	Games: eight Pong and two rifle		AY-3-8610		10	
Programmable TV-Game Console SD-050 / SD-05 / SD-050S	Soundic		1978	Hong Kong	PC-50x series Pong console		In PC-50x cartridges			
SD-061	Soundic		1978	Hong Kong	Soundic Pong console		AY-3-8610		10	
Programmable TV-Game Console SD-090	Soundic		1978	Hong Kong	PC-50x series console		In PC-50x cartridges			
SD-062 TV-18	Soundic		1978	Hong Kong	Ten Pong and four bike games		AY-3-8610; AY-3-8760		14	
SD-023C Tank Battle	Soundic		1978	Hong Kong	Tank game		AY-3-8710		1	
Video Raceway	Soundic		1977	Hong Kong	Motorbike and car games				6	
SD-04 (SD-042) TV Sports	Soundic		1978	Hong Kong	Pong console. Black and white or color		AY-3-8500		6	
TV-game programmable SD-070C Sport	Soundic		1978	Hong Kong	PC-50x console		In PC-50x cartridges			
TV Sport (SD-03-3)	Soundic			Hong Kong	Color pong console		NTL-600		3	
Video game SD-01 (TV sport) (4 games model)	Soundic		1977	Hong Kong	Black and white or colors pong console		AY-3-8500		4	
SD-019	Soundic		1978	Hong Kong	Pong and motorbike console		AY-3-8500; AY-3-8760		10	
TV Sports SD-045	Soundic		1978	Hong Kong	Pong and tanks game console		AY-3-8610; AY-3-8710	light gun	11	
TV Sports SD-04 46	Soundic		1978	Hong Kong	Pong target and bike console		AY-3-8500; AY-3-8760	light gun paddle	10	
Color TV sports 406	Soundic		1977	Hong Kong	Pong console			light gun	6	
Coloursports Programmable	Sovereign		1978	United Kingdom	PC-50x pong console		In PC-50x cartridges			
Coloursports	Sovereign		1977	United Kingdom	Six games pong console			light gun	6	
Supersports TV game	Sovereign		1978	United Kingdom	Pong console			light gun	6	
Turnir			1978	Soviet Union	dedicated Pong home console released in the Soviet Union		AY-3-8500		4	
Eureka (Эврика)			1978	Soviet Union	Mid-90s soviet union Pong console. Built somewhere in Ukraine		К145ИК17		7	
BTSTI + Rubin Ts1-205			1981	Soviet Union	TV plus integrated block to play Pong games		К145ИК17			
NTL-600 Video T.V. Game	Sportel		1977	United Kingdom	Pong console		NTL-600		3	
XY-4	Sportel		1977	United Kingdom	Pong console				4	
Paddle IV	Sportel			United Kingdom	Sportel Pong console		AY-3-8500		4	
101	Sportron		1977	France	Pong console		AY-3-8500		4	old-computers.com ID
105	Sportron		1977	France	Pong console		AY-3-8500	light gun	6	
201	Sportron		1977	France	Pong console				3	
Programaster	Sportron		1978	France	PC-50x series		In PC-50x cartridges			
108	Sportron		1978	France	Pong console				8	
TV Game (TVG901 4 games)	Sportsmaster		1977	France	Pong console with four games		AY-3-8500		4	
TV Game (TVG901 6 games)	Sportsmaster		1977	France	Pong console with six games		AY-3-8500		6	
SD-050F	Sportsmaster		1978	France	PC-50x series Pong console		In PC-50x cartridges			
TVG-621	Super Raf		1977	France	Pong console				4	
TV Jogo 3	SuperKit		1981	Brazil	Pong console				3	
TV Jogo 4	SuperKit		1981	Brazil	Pong console				4	
TV Jogo Formula 1	SuperKit		1981	Brazil	first generation console				1	
Telejogo Super Motocross	SuperKit		1981	Brazil	first generation console				4	
TV Challenger Series 3000 (TVC-3000)	Superlectron		1977	Germany	Pong console		AY-3-8500		4	old-computers.com ID
TV Challenger Series 2000	Superlectron		1976	Germany	Pong console. Analog		transistor–transistor logic		3	
Kanal 34			1975	Sweden	Swedish clone of Magnavox Odyssey		diode–transistor logic			
Videoshoot	Syrelec		1977	France	Pong console				4	
Videoshoot 2	Syrelec		1977	France	Color Pong home console		AY-3-8500		4	
Varius~Play	TAE (Técnicas Avanzadas Electrónicas)		1977	Spain	Pong console		AY-3-8550		4	
Video Cassette Rock	Takatoku Toys		1977	Japan	Pong console game. PC-50x series		In PC-50x cartridges			
T.U.G.	Takatoku Toys		1977	Japan	Pong console				6	
Talent TV & Pong set	Talent		1977	Argentina	Television and pong console					
TV Scoreboard 60-3060	Tandy Corporation		1977	United States	Handheld Pong console		AY-3-8500		4	
TV Scoreboard 60-3061	Tandy Corporation		1977	United States	Handheld Pong console. Four pong and two rifle games		AY-3-8500	light gun	6	
TV Scoreboard 60-9001	Tandy Corporation		1977	United States	Pong console		AY-3-8500		4	
TV Scoreboard 60-9005	Tandy Corporation		1977	United States	Pong console. games: Enduro, Cross, Stunt cycle, drag, race, target, skeet target, tennis, foot, squash, practice		AY-3-8500; AY-3-8760	light gun	10	
Video Sport 600	TCR		1977	United States	Pong console		TMS-1965N		4	
Video Sport 7705	TCR		1978	United States	Pong console		AY-3-8500	light gun	6	
Video Sport 7801 (104)	TCR		1978	United States	Pong console		AY-3-8500		4	
Video Sport 900 Programmable Cartridge game in color	TCR		1978	United States	PC-50x series. 90x cartridge format		In PC-50x cartridges			
Video Sport 7701	TCR		1977	United States	Pong home console				4	
Video Volley	TD Manufacturing Co.			United States	Pong console. Games: tennis, hockey and handball				3	
TC 4000 Programmable video computer system	TEAA				PC-50x Pong console		In PC-50x cartridges			
FS4 Fernsehspiel	TEC		1977	Germany	Pong console		AY-3-8500		4	
FS-404	TEC		1977	Germany	Pong console		AY-3-8500		4	
FS-204 Fernsehspiel	TEC		1977	Germany	Pong console		AY-3-8500		4	
TV Sport	Technigraph		1977	United Kingdom	Pong console. White or woodgrain case		AY-3-8500		4	
TV Sport mark I	Technigraph		1977	United Kingdom	Pong console. same look of "TV Sport"		AY-3-8500		4	
TVG SD-1	Technigraph		1977	United Kingdom	Pong console		AY-3-8500		4	
TVG-868 - Video Sports - Programmable TV Game	Tectronic		1978	Italy	Pong console		In PC-50x cartridges			
Tele Match 4 (model 7700)	Tele-Match inc.		1977	United States	Pong console model		AY-3-8500		4	
Tele-Match 4 (model 4400)	Tele-Match inc.		1976	United States	Pong console		AY-3-8500		4	
Tele-Match Concert Hall IV (model 8800)	Tele-Match inc.		1976	United States	Pong console		AY-3-8500		4	
Tele-Match 4 (6600)	Tele-Match inc.		1977	United States	Pong console				4	
Television Computer Game 3300R	Tele-Match inc.		1977	United States	Pong game		SN76410N		5	
Giochi Televisivi (Mod. G)	Tele-Partner		1977	Italy	Pong console. Games: pong and race		AY-3-8500; AY-3-8760	light gun	10	old-computers.com ID
TV Game Programmable (CL-2002)	Tele-Partner		1978	Italy	PC-50x series		In PC-50x cartridges			
Video Game Tank-Battle - SD-02-3	Tele-Partner		1977	Italy	Pong Home console. Tank battle games with colors		AY-3-8710		1	
BN/CL-1010 (TVG-SD-04)	Tele-Partner		1977	Italy	Pong console with color(CL) or black and white(BN)		AY-3-8610		10	
Giochi Televisivi (BN-606P)	Tele-Partner		1977	Italy	Pong console				4	
Paris Video Sport FY 707	Teleflip		1977	France	Pong console		AY-3-8500		4	old-computers.com ID
Paris Video Couleur CB-812	Teleflip			France	Pong console				3	
Match I	Telegioca		1977	Italy	Pong console. Can be black, blue or green				4	
Telegol	Telegol		1977	Argentina	Analogic Pong console				3	
Telegol 2	Telegol		1977	Argentina	Analogic Argentinian Pong console				5	
Colourstars	Teleng		1977	United Kingdom	PC-50x series. Teleng cartridge format		In PC-50x cartridges			old-computers.com ID
Colourstars TV game	Teleng		1977	United Kingdom	Pong console. U.K. flag on the case		AY-3-8500	light gun	6	
Telestars	Teleng		1977	United Kingdom	Pong console				4	
Grand Prix	Teleplay		1978	United Kingdom	Two pong era race games				2	
TV Games	Teleplay		1977	United Kingdom	Pong console. Two case format available			light gun	8	
Colour Programagame	Teleplay		1978	United Kingdom	PC-50x pong console		In PC-50x cartridges			
Video Entertainment Unit	Teleplay		1978	United Kingdom	PC-50x series		In PC-50x cartridges			
Telegame 4002	Teletronix		1978	Brazil	Pong console				4	
T-800	Temco		1979	Netherlands	Black and white display Pong console		AY-3-8500		4	
T-800C colour TV game	Temco		1979	Netherlands	Colour Pong console		AY-3-8500		4	
T-106C	Temco		1977	Netherlands	Pong console			light gun	6	
T-900 TV. GAME	Temco		1979	Netherlands	Handheld Pong console		TMS-1965N		4	
T-802C colour TV game	Temco		1977	Netherlands	Pong color console; "C" stands for Color model				4	
T-802	Temco		1977	Netherlands	Black and white model		AY-3-8500		4	
Programmable TVGame SD-050C	Tempest		1978	Australia	PC-50x series		In PC-50x cartridges			
TVG 846CP	Tempest		1978	Australia	Australian Pong console		AY-3-8500	light gun	6	
T.V. Games TVG-821	Tempest			Australia	Pong console		AY-3-8500	light gun	6	
TV Game PP-150 Giocattolo	Tenko		1977	Italy	Pong console manufactured by Tenko		AY-3-8500		4	
Giocattolo TV Colour Game T-106C	Tenko		1977	Italy	Pong console		AY-3-8500	light gun	6	
TV Colour Game PP-150C Giocattolo	Tenko		1977	Italy	Color Pong console manufactured by Tenko		AY-3-8500		4	
Video Game TVG-204	Termbray		1977	United Kingdom	Pong console		AY-3-8500		4	
TV Game	Termbray		1977	United Kingdom	Handheld Pong console				4	
TV hra XD 8001	Tesla			Czech Republic	Pong console		Tesla		2	
Televízny tenis - XD 8000A	Tesla		1979	Czech Republic	Pong console				1	
Standard TV game (TV6)	Tesla			Czech Republic	Pong console				6	
Automático	Teyboll		1976	Argentina	Argentina pong console				3	
JV 1002	Thomson		1977	France	Pong console. Games: Bataille aerienne(two target games), hockey sur glace, football, labyrinthe(gridball), basket(two), tennis, squash, pelote		AY-3-8610		10	
Jeu Video - JV 402T	Thomson		1977	France	Pong console				4	
Jeu Video JV 1T	Thomson		1977	France	Pong console. Interton 2400 rebranded for French market		AY-3-8500		5	old-computers.com ID
TV with Pong console	Thomson		1977	France	television with integrated pong console		AY-3-8500; TMS-1965N		4	
Jeu Video JV 2T	Thomson		1977	France	Pong console		AY-3-8500	light gun	6	
Teletenis Multijuegos	Togisa, S.A.		1976-09-06	Spain	cartridge wireless videogame console		CMOS		6	
Teletenis Compact Color Video Game	Togisa, S.A.		1977	Spain	Color pong console		AY-3-8500		6	
Teletenis Mini	Togisa, S.A.		1977	Spain	Black and white screen pong console		AY-3-8500		5	
Teletenis compact	Togisa, S.A.		1977	Spain	Black and white Pong home console		AY-3-8500		6	
Colour 4	Tokyo		1977	United Kingdom	Pong console				4	old-computers.com ID
Colour 10	Tokyo			United Kingdom	Pong console				10	
Colour 6	Tokyo		1977	United Kingdom	Pong console				6	
Sportsman	Tokyo		1977	United Kingdom	B/W screen Pong console				4	
TV Fun Color Model 601	Tomy		1977	Japan	Pong console. White or brown case		AY-3-8500		3	
TV Fun Color Model 902	Tomy		1978	Japan	Pong console. Four stunt cycle and one car race games				5	
TV Fun 301	Tomy		1977	Japan	Pong console				4	
TV Fun 401	Tomy		1977	Japan	Pong console		AY-3-8500		4	
TV Fun Color Model 501	Tomy		1977	Japan	Pong console		AY-3-8500		3	
TV Fun Color Model 602	Tomy		1977	Japan	Pong console		MSL9320		3	
TV Fun Color Model 701	Tomy		1977	Japan	Pong console				8	
TV Fun 801	Tomy		1978	Japan	Pong console			light gun	4	
TV Fun 901	Tomy		1978	Japan	Pong console. four stunt cycle and four pong games				8	
TV Sport EP-800	Topaz		1977	United Kingdom	Pong console		TMS-1965N		4	
Video Game TVG-610	Toshiba		1977	Japan	Pong console, it's an Epoch TV Game System 10			light gun	10	
Color TV Sports TVG-406-6	Trensi		1977	Spain	Pong home console		AY-3-8500	light gun	6	
Color TV Sport 406-6	Trevi s.r.l.			Italy	Clone of the Conic TV Sports 406-6			light gun	6	
TV Game-programmable SD-070	TriStar		1978	Sweden	PC-50x pong console		In PC-50x cartridges			
SD-050	TriStar		1978	Sweden	PC-50x pong console		In PC-50x cartridges			
Tele-Juego - B/N 4	TRQ - Talleres Radioeléctricos Querol S.L.		1977	Spain	Pong console		AY-3-8500		4	
Tele-Juego Color-4	TRQ - Talleres Radioeléctricos Querol S.L.		1977	Spain	Color Pong console		AY-3-8500		4	
Tele-Juego Color-10	TRQ - Talleres Radioeléctricos Querol S.L.		1980	Spain	Pong console		AY-3-8610		10	
TV 18 Color (C-4016)	TV18 (TV 2018)		1978	Germany	Pong console		AY-3-8610; AY-3-8760		18	
TV 2018 Color (20 441/2)	TV18 (TV 2018)		1978	Germany	Pong console		AY-3-8610; AY-3-8760		18	
TV-18 (Mega 52080-3)	TV18 (TV 2018)		1978	Germany	Pong console, black and white		AY-3-8610; AY-3-8760		18	
TV-9010	Ultrasound		1977	Germany	Black and white Pong console		AY-3-8500		4	old-computers.com ID
TV-9010-C	Ultrasound		1977	Germany	Color Pong console		AY-3-8500		4	
Tele-Sports	Ultrasound		1977	Germany	Pong console. With yellow or orange buttons. Identical to Radofin Telesports		AY-3-8500		4	old-computers.com ID
F-8 (703 SE)	Uni-Vid		1978	France	Pong console, manufactured by Korean Sunny Emi Company Ltd. and rebranded by French Uni-Vid		AY-3-8600		8	
TV-10 Color (Mark IX)	Unimex		1978	Germany	PC-50x series. Sold also as "Mark IX" with no clear cosmetic/hardware differences		In PC-50x cartridges			old-computers.com ID
Mark V	Unimex		1977	Germany	Mark V-B: black and white, Mark V-C: color		AY-3-8500	light gun	6	
Mark IV	Unimex		1977	Germany	Pong console			light gun	6	
Mark III	Unimex		1977	Germany	Pong console				4	
Mark VI	Unimex		1977	Germany	PC-50x series		In PC-50x cartridges			
Mark VII	Unimex		1977	Germany	Pong console			light gun	6	
Mark VIII	Unimex		1977	Germany	Handheld Pong console			light gun	8	
TELE-SET GTV 881	Unimor		1978	Poland	Pong console. Only one cartridge known: Kometka(badminton). The paddles connect in the rear of cartridge		7400 series		1	
Tournament 2000	Unisonic Products Corporation		1977	United States	Pong console		AY-3-8500	light gun	6	
Tournament 100	Unisonic Products Corporation		1976	United States	Pong console		AY-3-8500		4	
Sportsman T101	Unisonic Products Corporation		1976	United States	Pong console		AY-3-8500		4	
Tournament 102	Unisonic Products Corporation		1976	United States	Pong console				3	
Tournament 150	Unisonic Products Corporation		1976	United States	Pong console		AY-3-8500	light gun	6	
Tournament 200	Unisonic Products Corporation		1976	United States	Pong console		AY-3-8500		4	
Tournament 1000	Unisonic Products Corporation		1977	United States	Pong console		AY-3-8500		4	
Tournament 2501	Unisonic Products Corporation		1977	United States	Pong console		AY-3-8500	light gun	6	
Olympian 2600	Unisonic Products Corporation		1977	United States	Color Pong console		AY-3-8610		10	
Video Action	Unitrex of America, Inc.		1977	United States	Pong console				4	
Video-Pro	Unitrex of America, Inc.		1977	United States	Pong console				4	
Video-Pro II	Unitrex of America, Inc.		1977	United States	Pong console				4	
Video Action VA-II	Universal Research Laboratories, Inc.		1975	United States	Universal Research Pong console. Digital (TTL) implementation. Tennis hockey and soccer games		transistor–transistor logic		3	
Video Action VA-III	Universal Research Laboratories, Inc.		1976	United States	Universal Research Pong console. Digital (CMOS) implementation		CMOS		2	
Video Action TV Game 1000	Universal Research Laboratories, Inc.		1976	United States	Universal Research Pong console			light gun	6	
Video Action IV Indy 500 (S-100)	Universal Research Laboratories, Inc.		1976	United States	Two Ball and Paddle variants and two car racing games		F-4301		4	
TV-Multi-Spiel 4014	Universum		1980	Germany	Pong console. Two shooting games are played with the joysticks		AY-3-8610; AY-3-8760		14	old-computers.com ID
TV-Multi-spiel 2006	Universum		1978	Germany	Pong console		AY-3-8500	light gun	6	old-computers.com ID
TV-Multi Spiel 2004	Universum		1977	Germany	Pong console		AY-3-8500		4	
Color-Multi-Spiel 4004	Universum		1977	Germany	Pong console		AY-3-8500		4	
Color-Multi-Spiel 4010	Universum		1979	Germany	Pong console. Shooting games played with the joysticks		AY-3-8610		10	old-computers.com ID
Color Multi-Spiel 4106	Universum		1977	Germany	Pong console		AY-3-8500	light gun	6	
TV-Spiel 1004	Universum		1978	Germany	Pong console		AY-3-8500		4	old-computers.com ID
Multi-Spiel Color	Universum		1976	Germany	Pong handheld color console		AY-3-8500		4	
TV-Multi-Spiel	Universum		1976	Germany	Black and white Pong console. Handhleld		AY-3-8500		4	old-computers.com ID
Color Multi-Spiel 4006	Universum		1977	Germany	Pong console		AY-3-8500	light gun	6	
TV Multi-Spiel (Mod. PT 1/Q)	Universum		1976	Germany	Pong console manufactured by Zanussi		AY-3-8500	light gun	6	
41N	Univox		1977	France	Pong console, identical to Gamatic 7600		TMS-1965N		4	old-computers.com ID
4200n	Univox		1977	France	Pong console				4	
6IN	Univox		1978	France	Pong console		AY-3-8500	light gun	6	
Tele-Sports 6	Univox		1981	France	Pong console. Games: cible mobile, cible mouvante, football, pelote, mur, tennis		AY-3-8500	light gun	6	
Telesport 10	Univox		1981	France	Pong console				10	
Jeu Video Cassette Interchangeables Tele-sports III	Univox		1978	France	Pong console. PC-50x series		In PC-50x cartridges			
TV game AU-708	Vanica		1977	Austria	pong console				4	
Video Sports VS-1	Venture Electronics		1976	United States	Pong console		AY-3-8500		4	
Video Sports VS-5	Venture Electronics		1977	United States	Pong console		SN76410N		5	
Video Sports VS-7	Venture Electronics		1977	United States	Pong console		MPS-7600-001	light gun	8	
TV Spel T-338	Verco				Pong console				4	
DX-503	Video 4000-EX		1977	British Hong Kong	Pong console				4	
5 Jeux - 2002	Video Stellar		1977	France	Pong console		TMS-1965N		5	
Combat Lunaire	Video Stellar		1978	France	Combat tank games home console. Two games variant: normal and lazeroïde		AY-3-8710		2	old-computers.com ID
Rally (VM4 MK1)	Videomaster		1975	United Kingdom	Analog (CMOS). Pong console		CMOS		2	
All Star (VMV9)	Videomaster		1978	United Kingdom	Two version: with and without with inners		AY-3-8500	light gun	6	
Colourscore (VM11)	Videomaster		1977	United Kingdom	Pong console		MM-57105N (PAL)		3	
Colourscore II (VMV6)	Videomaster		1979	United Kingdom	Pong console based on AY-3-8500-7		AY-3-8500	light gun	6	
Colourshot (VMV2)	Videomaster		1977	United Kingdom	Pong console		MM-57105N (PAL)		3	
Home TV Game (VM 577)	Videomaster		1974	United Kingdom	Analog (TTL). Plastic case		transistor–transistor logic		3	
Home TV Game MK2 (VM 577)	Videomaster		1975	United Kingdom	Analog (TTL). Bronze metal		transistor–transistor logic		3	
Home TV Game MK3 (VM3)	Videomaster		1975	United Kingdom	Analog. 2 versions: with and without scoring add-on		transistor–transistor logic		3	
Olympic Home T.V. Game (VM3-D)	Videomaster		1975	United Kingdom	Analog Pong console		transistor–transistor logic		6	
Sportsworld (VMV5)	Videomaster		1978	United Kingdom	Two versions: horiz. and vert. knobs or joysticks		AY-3-8610		10	
Strika (VM-13)	Videomaster		1977	United Kingdom	Pong console		AY-3-8500		4	
Strika 2 (VMV8)	Videomaster		1977	United Kingdom	Pong console		AY-3-8500		4	
Superscore (VM-8)	Videomaster		1976	United Kingdom	Two versions: normal and carry case		AY-3-8500		6	
Visionscore (VMV1)	Videomaster		1977	United Kingdom	Pong console		MM-57105N (PAL)		3	
Colour Cartridge (VMV12)	Videomaster		1979	United Kingdom	PC-50x family console		In PC-50x cartridges			
Olympic Home TV Game (VM 3 MK II)	Videomaster		1976	United Kingdom	7 games Pong console		7400 series		7	
The Slammer (TVC-3000)	Videostar				Pong color display console				4	
The Charger	Videostar				Pong color display console				3	
Elektronikus TV játék	Videoton		1976	Hungary	Pong console		AY-3-8500		4	
Sportron 101	Videoton		1977	Hungary	Sporton 101 with Hungarian texts		AY-3-8500		4	
Computerized Ping Pong kit	Visulex		1976	United States	Early home video game system					
W TV 4	Waltham		1977	Germany	Pong console. Orange or white case		AY-3-8500		4	
WG-015	Weiner		1977	Austria	Pong console		AY-3-8500		4	
TV Game EP460	Windsor		1977	United States	Pong console		AY-3-8500		4	
TV Game EP500	Windsor		1976	United States	USA Pong console		AY-3-8500		4	
Video Game D-5614	Winthronics		1977	United Kingdom	Pong console		AY-3-8500		4	
Sport King Model-101	Y.S.A.		1976	Japan	Pong console			light gun	6	
Sport King Model-103	Y.S.A.		1977	Japan	Pong console			light gun	6	
TV Sports Star Model-105	Y.S.A.		1977	Japan	Pong console		TMS-1955	light gun	6	
Sportfun TV game	Yoko		1977	Netherlands	Pong console				4	
T-338	Zeon		1977	United Kingdom	Pong console. Identical to Hanimex T-338 and Ajax T-338		AY-3-8500		4	
T-800	Zeon		1977	United Kingdom	Black and white images Pong console		AY-3-8500		4	
T-800C	Zeon		1977	United Kingdom	Color Pong console		AY-3-8500		4	
106C Colour Video Sport	Zeon		1977	United Kingdom	Pong console			light gun	6	
Zhoushi TV	Zhoushi Electronic Enterprise Co., Ltd.		1977	Taiwan	Pong console			light gun	6	

=== Canceled Systems ===
Canceled First Generation Consoles
Company	Name	Intended release year	Integrated Chip	Cartridge Based	Light Gun	Image	Fate
APF	TV Fun (Model 500)	1978		No	No		Canceled American release of the Bandai TV-Jack 2500.
Atari	Tank II	1977		No	No		Controller design reporpused for the Atari VCS (2600) console.
Atari	Game Brain	1978		Yes	No		Canceled to avoid confusion and competition with Atari's own VCS (2600) console.
Atari	Pong Doubles (C-160)	1976		No	No		Did no reach the market for unknown reasons. Maybe because it was also distributed by Sears as PONG IV?
Magnavox	Odyssey 5000	1978	MM571068 MUGS-1	No	No		Design of the console and controllers was reworked into the Magnavox Odyssey^{2}.
Mera-Elzab	GEM-1	1978					After building a dozen consoles, all of them were destroyed due to dissatisfied management of the company.
Ośrodek Elektronizacji Gospodarki Narodowej		1979					The publishing of the console was announced in the magazine "Młody Technik" from 1979.
Vanguard (Cahué Industrial)	Vang-Ball (Vanguard - Ball)	1974		No	No		Cancelled Spanish Magnavox Odyssey clone designed during March to June 1974 based on evidence of patents, designs and trademark registers. It was partially based on the Overkal, another Spanish Magnavox Odyssey clone.
Cabel	Sirius	1982		Yes	No		Prototype, produced by Bergamo-based Cabel. Cartridge-based console, belonging to the PC-50x family.
