= Continental Edison =

French electrical equipment company

- Industry: Electricity
- Founded: 1882 in Paris
- Founder: Thomas Edison

The Continental Edison is a French manufacturing and marketing company of electrical equipment established in 1882 by Thomas Edison.

== History ==
Continental Edison was established in 1882 by French investors in partnership with Thomas Edison with the goal of marketing electric illumination and other equipment based on Edison patents. The company has gone through several changes of ownership and was a manufacturing company up to 1971 when it stopped producing its own televisions and other home appliances, outsourcing production after that. Products sold under the name include refrigerators, dishwashers, washing machines, and televisions.

Nikola Tesla started his career in the electric power industry at the newly established Continental Edison.

=== Timeline ===
- 1882 – Continental Edison founded
- 1881–1958 – part of General Electric
- 1958–1971 – owned by Compagnie Générale des Eaux (CGE)
- 1971–1997 – owned by Thomson Multimedia
- 1997–2002 – owned by Cofidur group, a French electronic subcontractor supplier
- 1999 – diversifies into multimedia products for the TV, PC and the Internet
- December 2002, Continental Edison taken over by the AIT YALA K&S group.
- 2006, the brand was bought by the Chinese group Xoceco
- 2011 owned by the French Casino Group. It is currently distributed almost exclusively by Cdiscount
