= Gameroom Tele-Pong =

Home video game console

- Manufacturer: Entex Industries
- Type: Dedicated home video game console
- Released: 1976
- Display: TV

The Gameroom Tele-Pong (sometimes also called Entex Gameroom Tele-Pong or ENTEX Gameroom Tele-Pong) is a dedicated first-generation home video game console developed, published and marketed by Entex Industries starting in 1976. It had a price of US$60. The Gameroom Tele-Pong displays the games in black and white. The score is built in the console. It does have sound. The Gameroom Tele-Pong is similar to the first Japanese video game console, Epoch's TV Tennis Electrotennis, released a year prior.

The console does not contain a central CPU but uses 8 discrete SN74LS00 chips. It is only battery-operated (1.5V "C" cell x 4).

There was also a version released in the United Kingdom marketed by Binatone called the TV Game Unit. It had a price of £23.95.
