= VideoSport MK2 =

Dedicated home video game console by Henry's

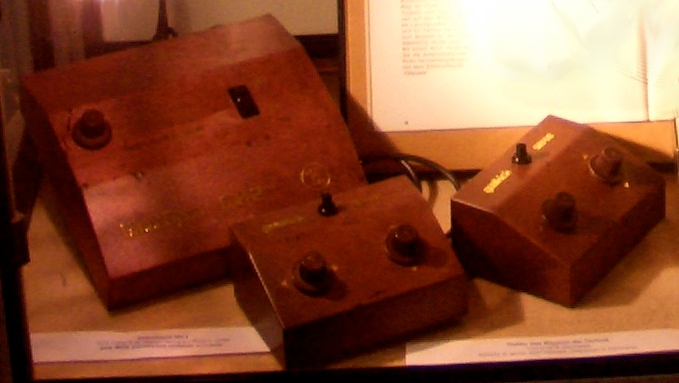
- A VideoSport MK2
- Manufacturer: VideoSport Ltd. / Redbourn Plastics
- Type: Dedicated home video game console
- Generation: First generation
- Released: March 1975
- Lifespan: 1975 - 1977?
- Introductory price: £37.50
- Discontinued: Unknown
- Units sold: >10,000 (as of May 1976)
- Units shipped: Unknown
- Weight: Unknown
- Predecessor: None
- Successor: None

The VideoSport MK2 is a dedicated home video game console produced by VideoSport Ltd. and Redbourn Plastics, based on Saint Albans (Hertfordshire). It was mostly distributed by Henry's, a British retailer of television and Hi-fi equipment, starting in 1975 until 1977. Customers could purchase the console in stores or have it delivered to them by mail. The original price was £37.50 in March 1975; it dropped to £34.72 in May 1975, to £29.50 in May 1976 and to £20.20 later in 1976 or early 1977. By May 1976, over 10,000 units of the console had been sold.

It was one of the first European video game consoles.

== Hardware ==
=== Console and controllers ===
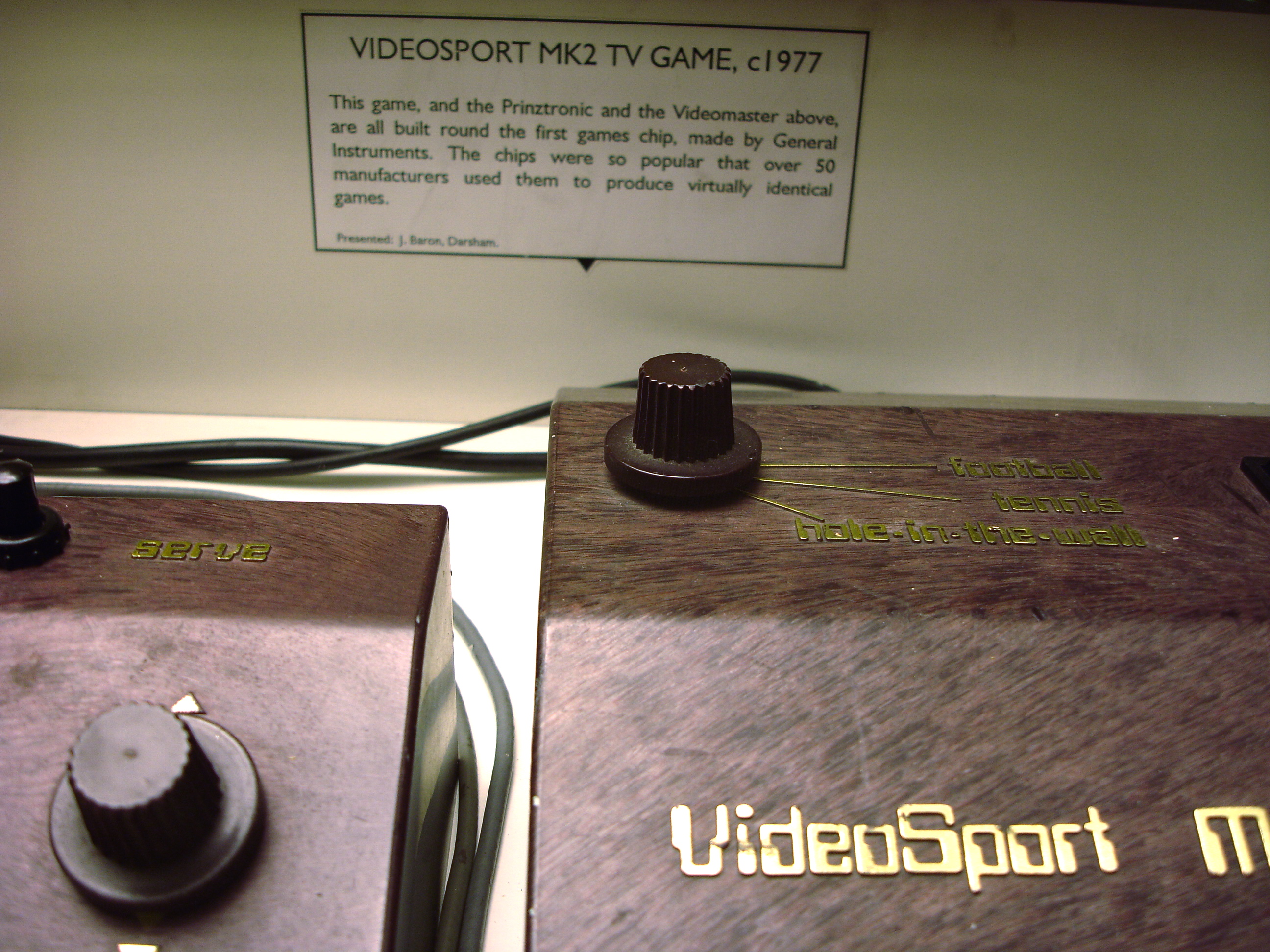
A close up of the VideoSport MK2 showing the knob used to choose between the console's three games

The console has a central body with only a power switch and a knob to select one of three games: Football, Tennis/Pong and Hole-in-the-wall. There are two controllers with cables that connect to the console, with two paddles each (for vertical and horizontal movement) and a button (for serving and goal kicking). There were two variations of the console, the original VideoSport MK2 with gold letters and a later VideoSport MK2 without gold letters, likely introduced in an attempt to reduce production costs. The VideoSport MK2 was mostly assembled by hand, and the colour of the push buttons depended on what parts had been purchased "on the fly".

=== Technical specifications ===
Inside the console, there are only two TTL-type integrated circuits, each containing four NAND ports. The remaining circuitry comprises discrete components only. The power supply is provided only through the mains current.
