= Interton Video 2800 =

First-generation home video game console

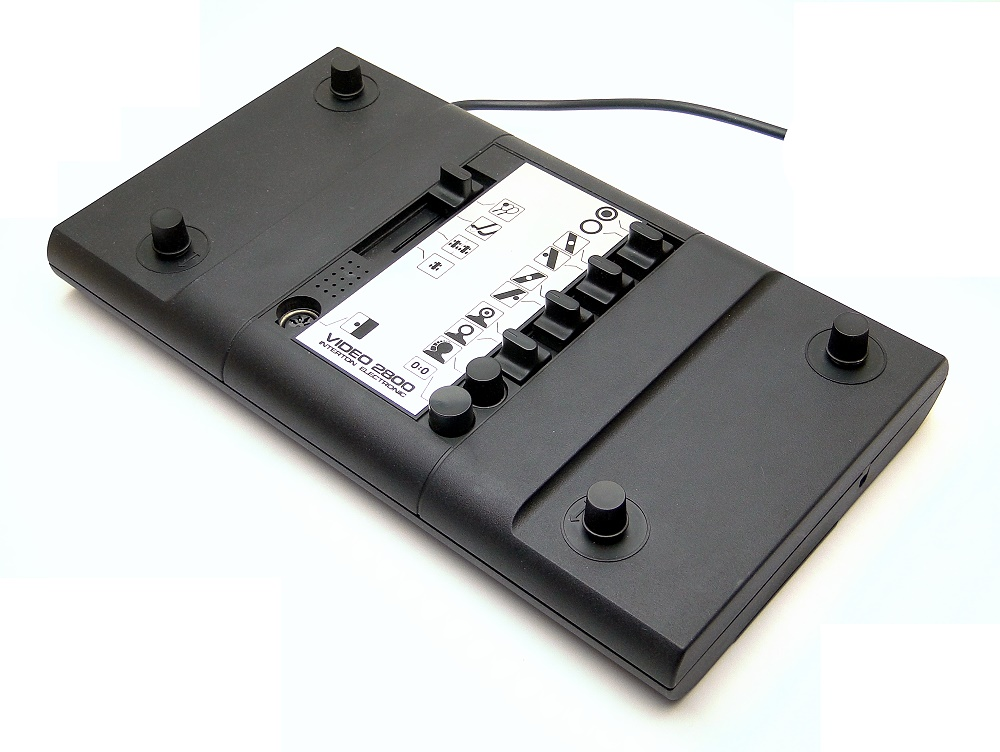
- An Interton Video 2800
- Manufacturer: Interton
- Type: Dedicated home video game console
- Generation: First generation
- Released: 1977
- Predecessor: Interton Video 2501
- Successor: Interton Video 3000

The Interton Video 2800 is a dedicated first-generation home video game console that was released in 1977 by Interton. It could output only black and white. It is the successor of the Interton Video 2501 and the predecessor of the Interton Video 3000.

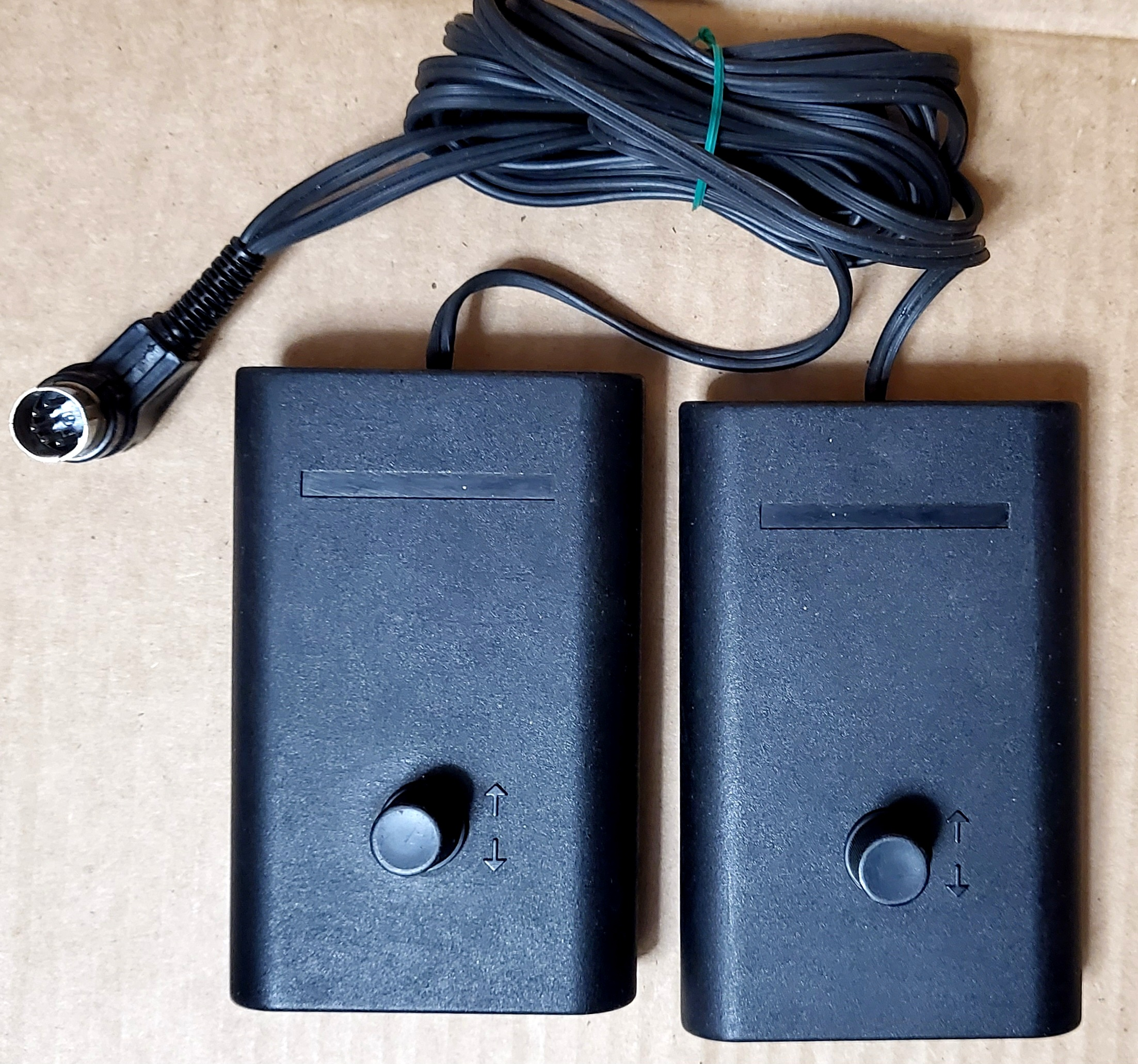
V360 Fernbedienung, optional controllers

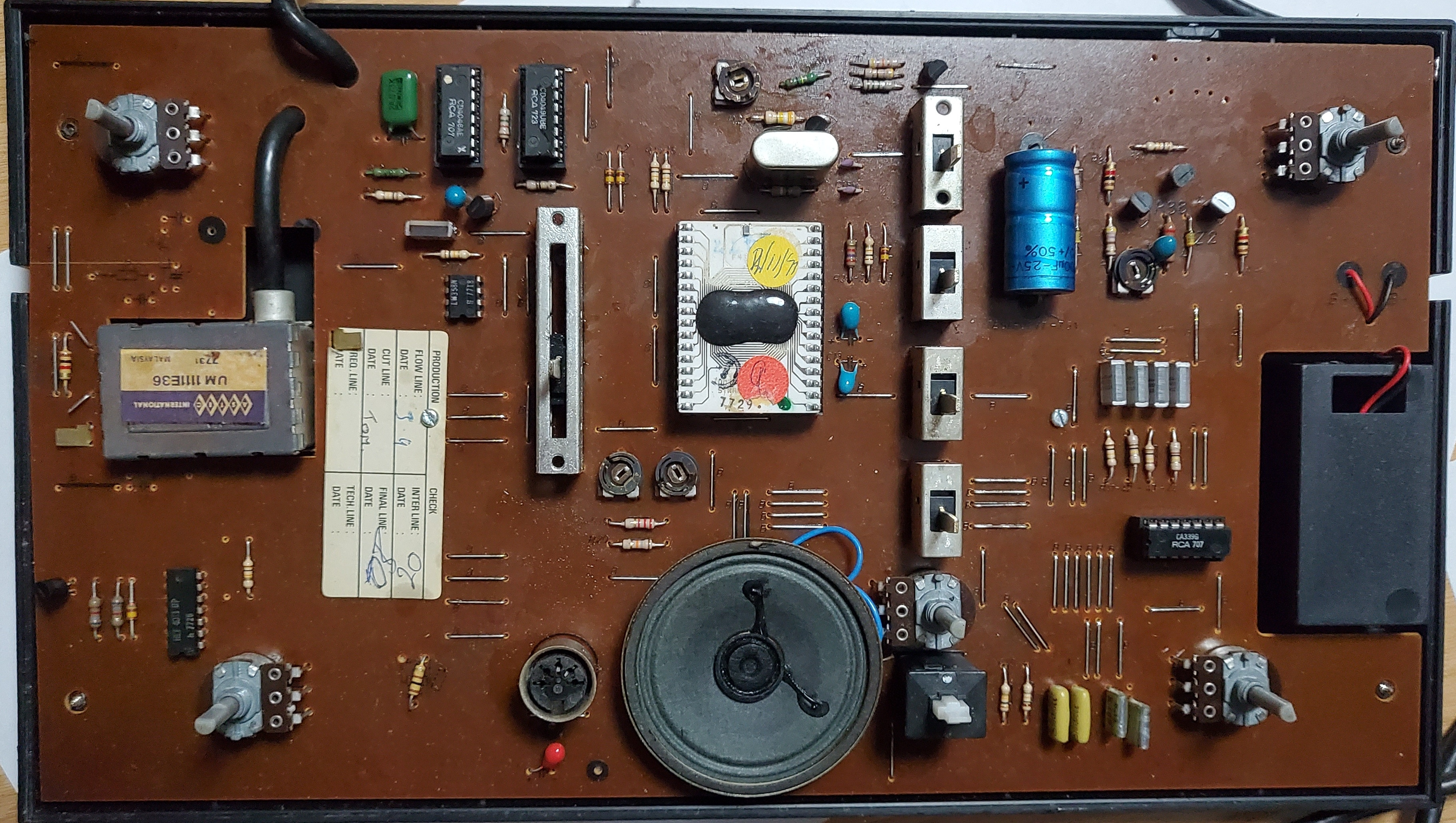
Internal view

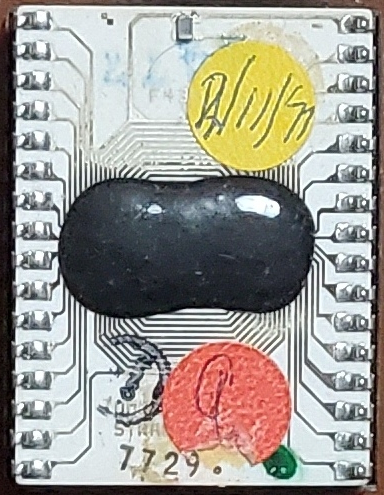
The Universal Research F4301 console CPU
