= Interton Video 2000 =

First-generation home video game console

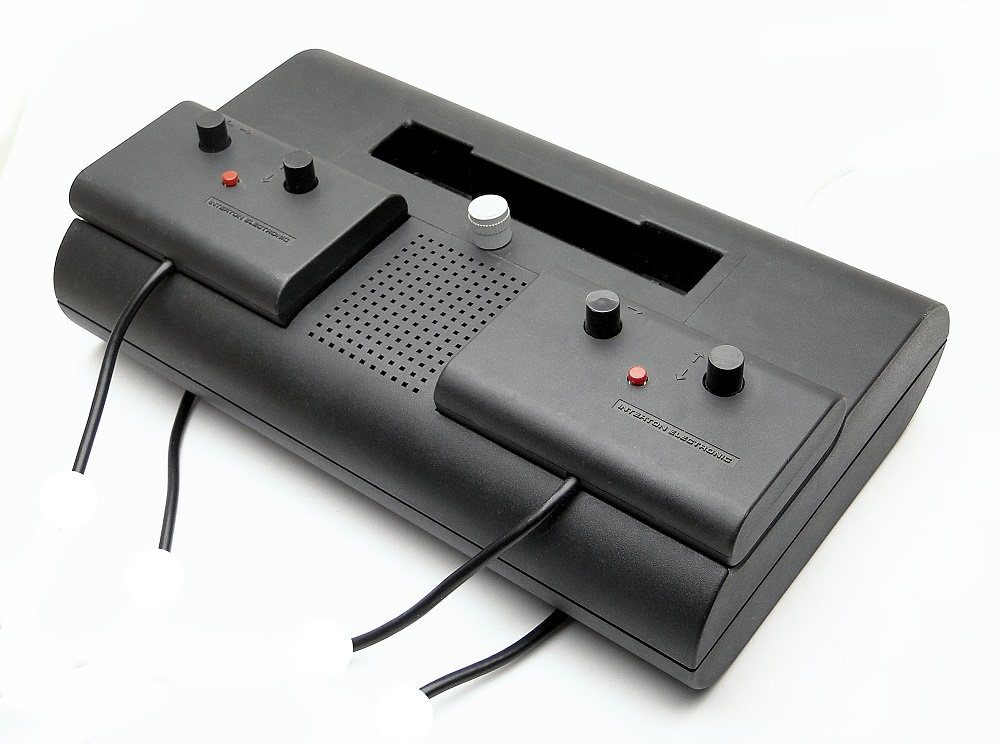
- The system with two paddle controllers
- Manufacturer: Interton
- Type: home video game console
- Generation: First generation
- Released: 1975
- Lifespan: 1975-1975?
- Discontinued: 1975?
- Input: Controllers
- Controller input: paddles
- Successor: Interton Video 2400
- Related: Teletenis Multijuegos

The Interton Video 2000 is a extremely rare first-generation home video game console released in 1975 by Interton in Germany. The console turns itself on automatically when a cartridge is inserted.

The Interton Video 2000 contains 14 CMOS chips, making it relatively advanced for its time. It was followed by the dedicated Interton Video 2400 in 1976.

It used discrete logic based cassettes like the more famous Philips Tele-Game ES 2201 of the Tele-Game series) from 1975.

The gtv 881 also used discrete logic cassettes two.The Interton video 2000 also had a clone called the muiltijungos tele tennis from 1976 and it had more games and it was Spanish.

== Games ==
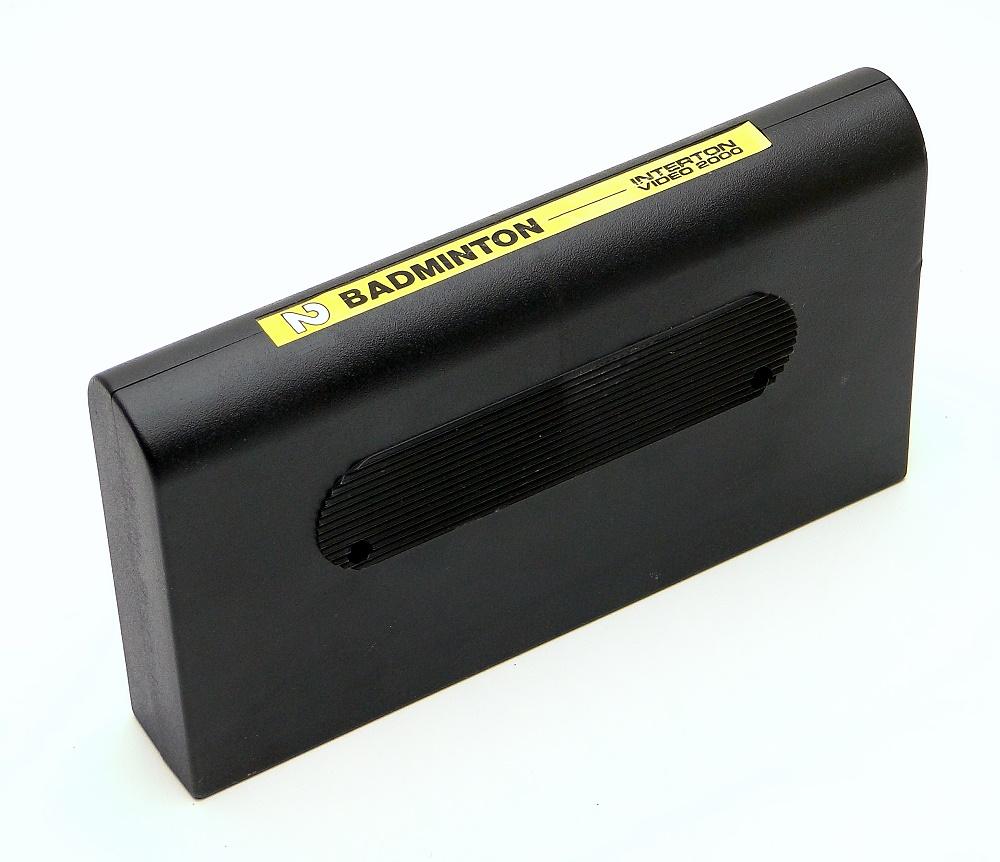
Cartridge number 2: badminton

On the box art for the console, ten game box arts are shown, but only five game cartridges were found:

1. Sparring
2. Badminton
3. Attacke
4. Tennis
5. Super Tennis

The super tennis game has the first point marker on a video game console using a point system.
