= Interton Video 2501 =

First-generation home video game console

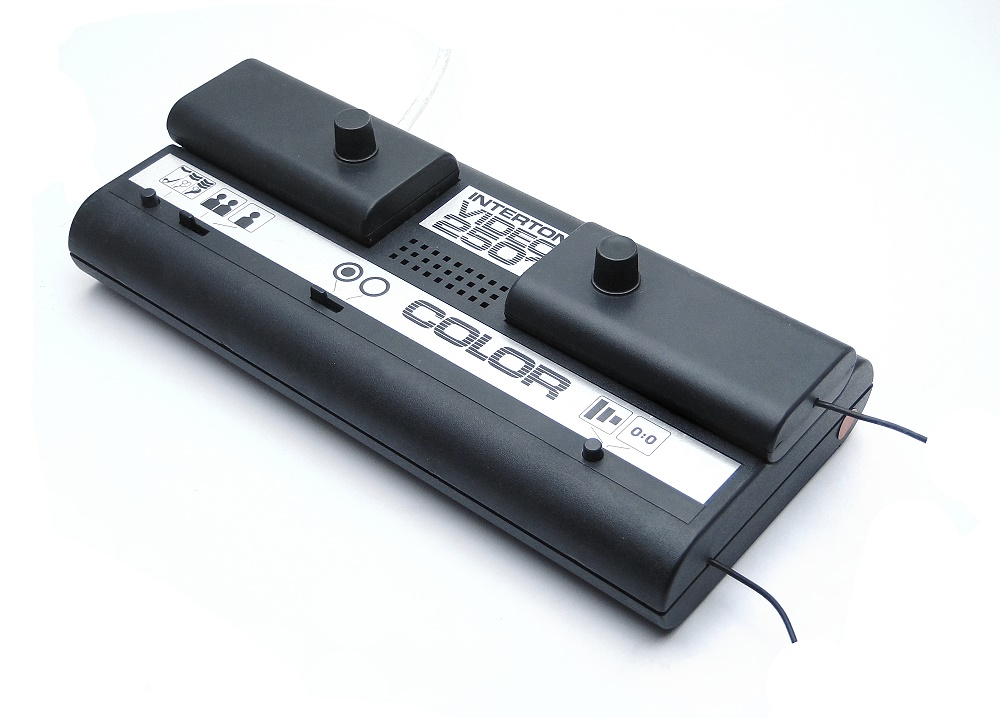
- An Interton Video 2501 with its two accompanying paddle-based game controllers
- Manufacturer: Interton
- Type: Dedicated home video game console
- Generation: First generation
- Released: 1977
- Predecessor: Interton Video 2400
- Successor: Interton Video 2800

The Interton Video 2501 is a dedicated first-generation home video game console that was released by Interton in 1977. It is the successor of the Interton Video 2400 and the predecessor of the Interton Video 2800. It can output the games in color.

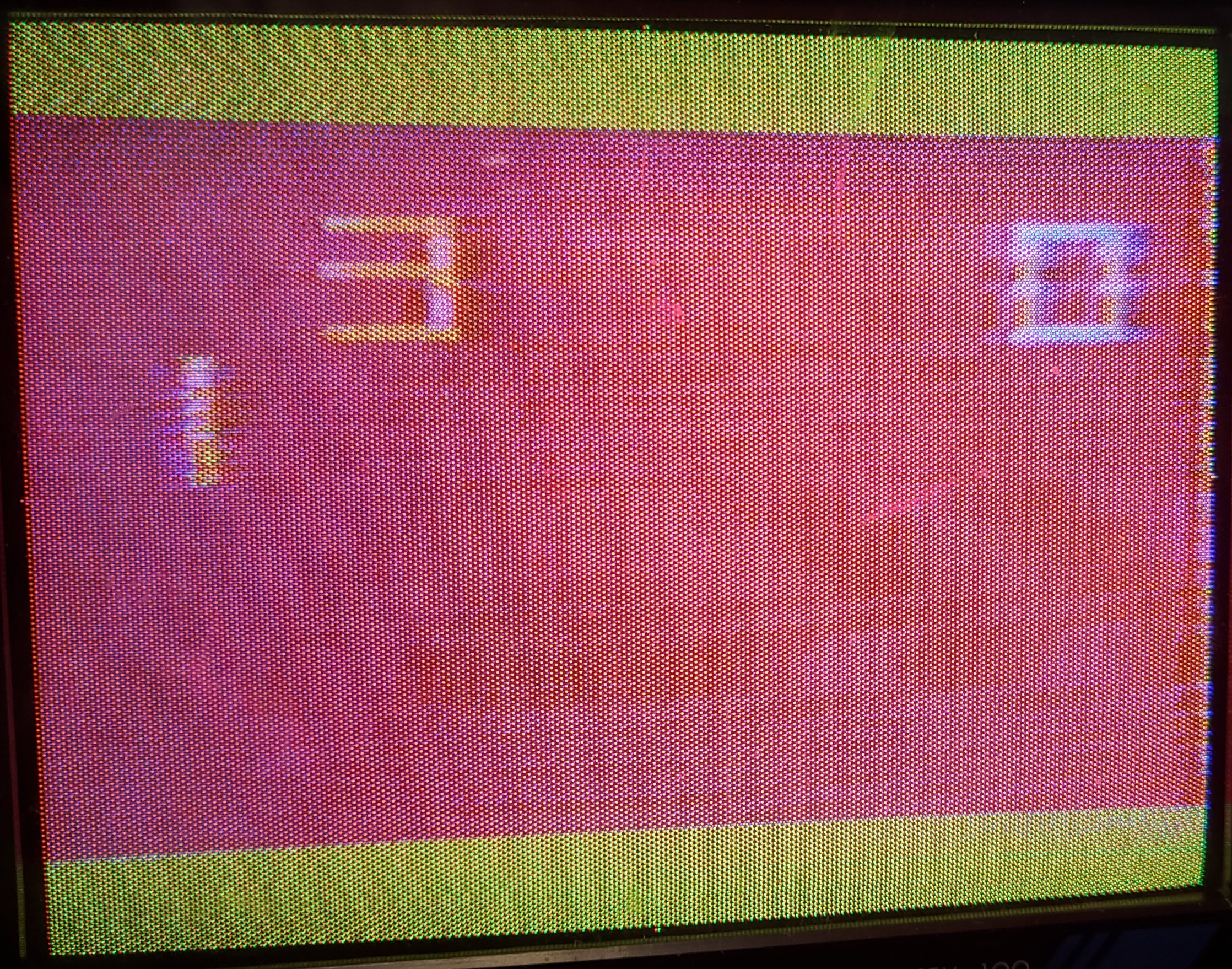

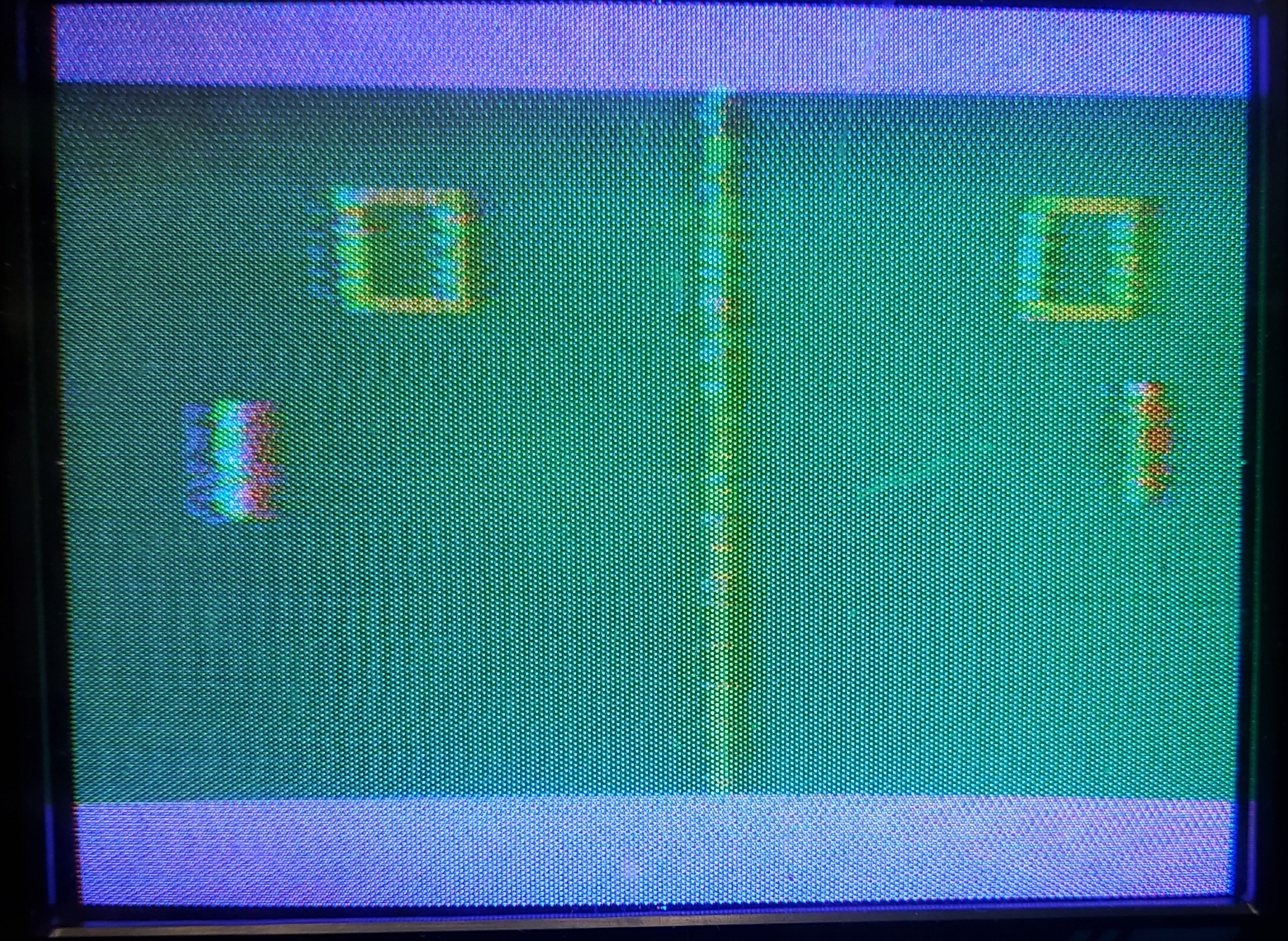

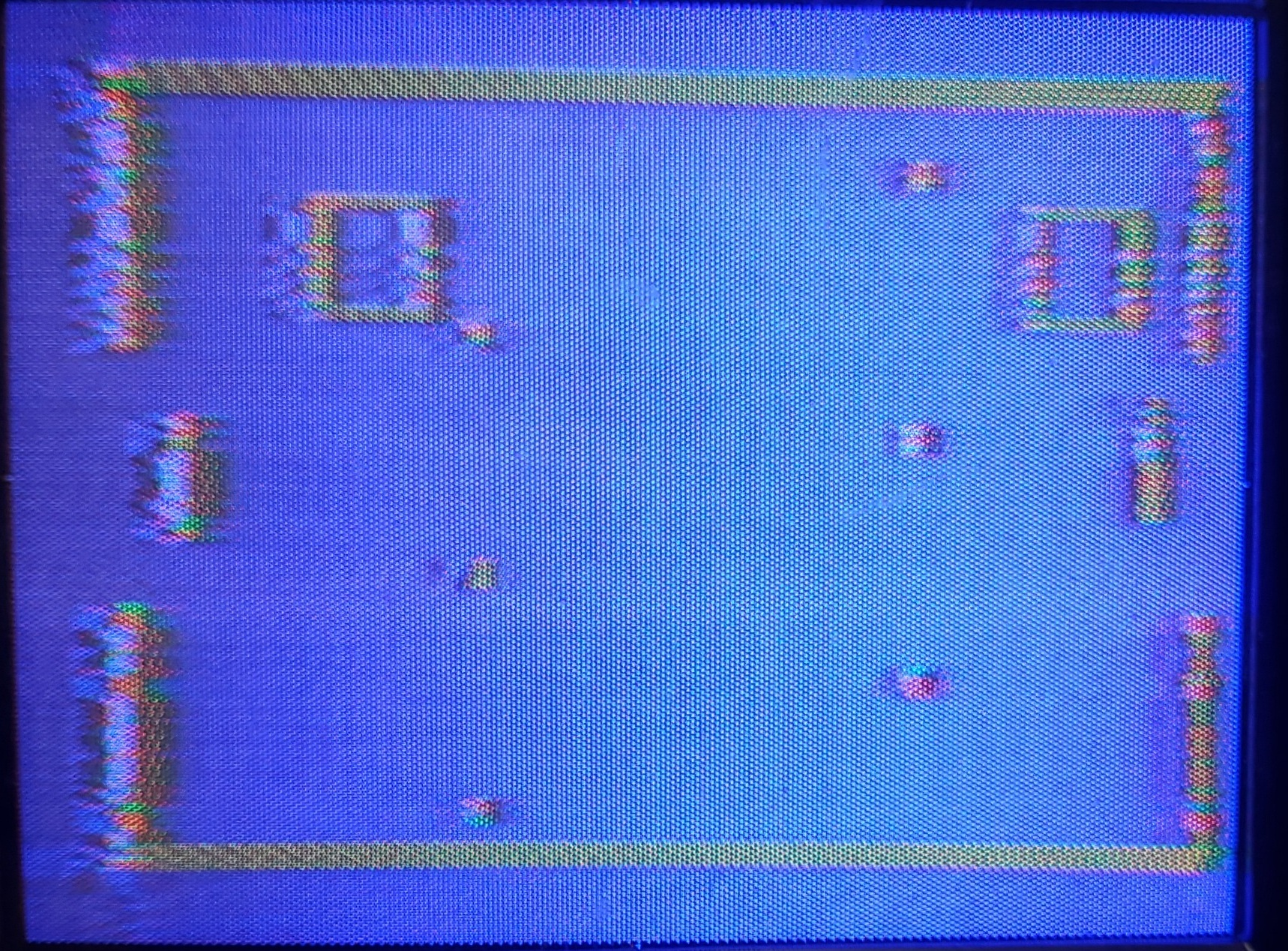
