= Interton Video 3000 =

First-generation home video game console

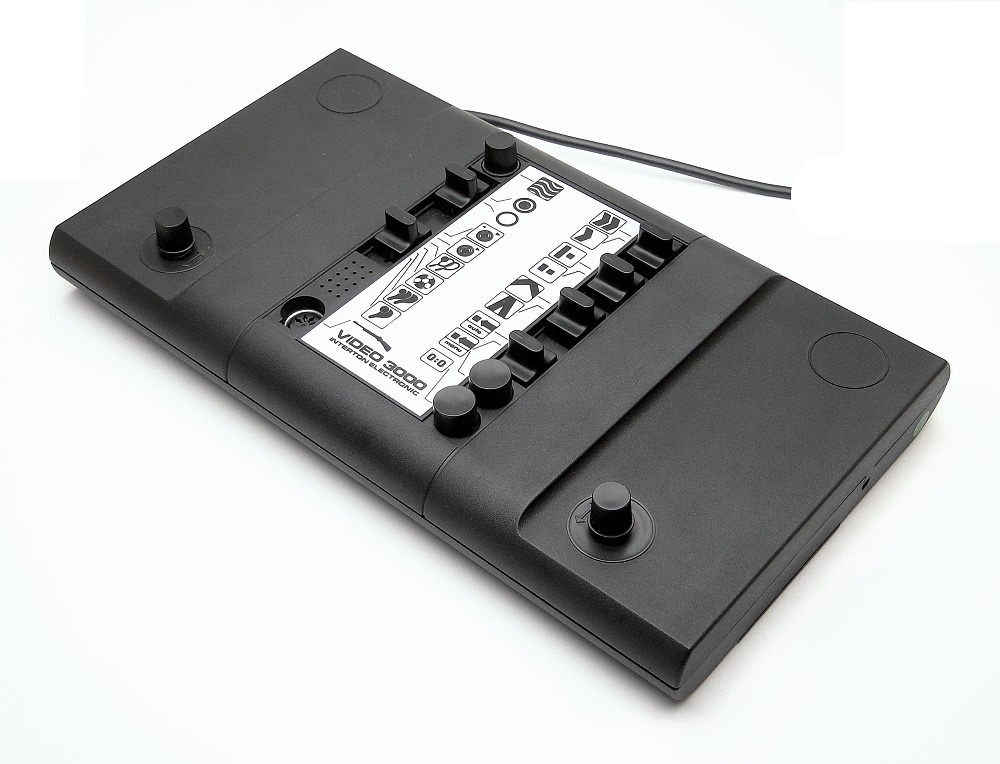
- An Interton Video 3000
- Manufacturer: Interton
- Type: Dedicated home video game console
- Generation: First generation
- Released: 1976
- Introductory price: 198 DM
- Predecessor: Interton Video 2800
- Successor: Interton Video 3001

The Interton Video 3000 is a dedicated first-generation home video game console that was released in Germany in 1976 by German manufacturer Interton and sold by Quelle. Due to the AY-3-8500 chipset from General Instrument, the console has six integrated games: Tennis (Pong clone), Football, Practice, Squash, Skeet and Moving target. It had a list price of 198 Deutsche Mark (DM). Its output is in black and white.

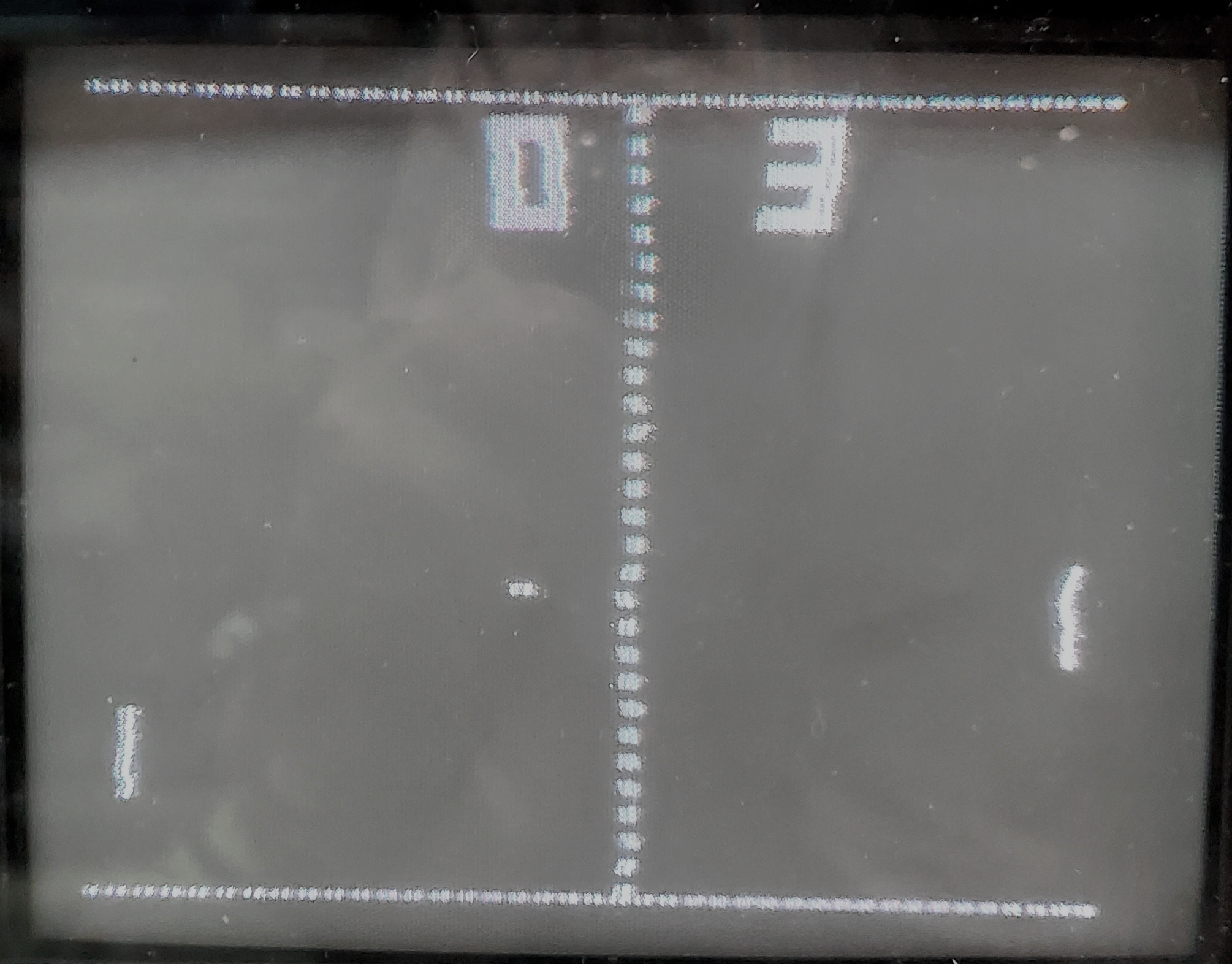
Black and white Tennis screenshot

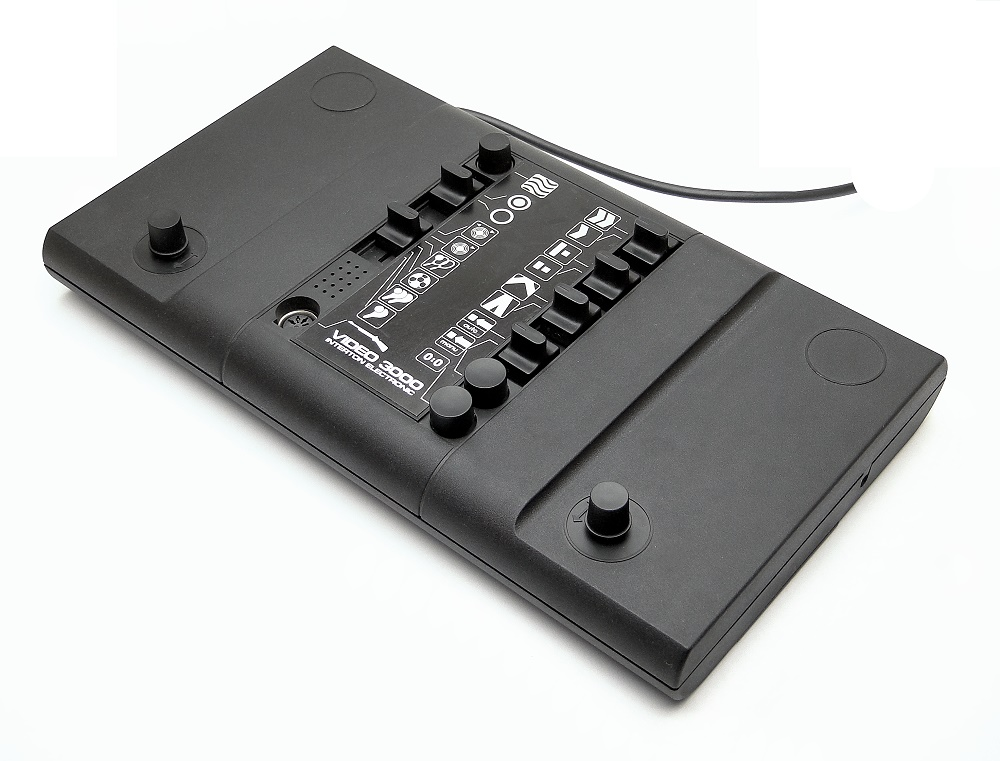
Interton Video 3000, Serie A

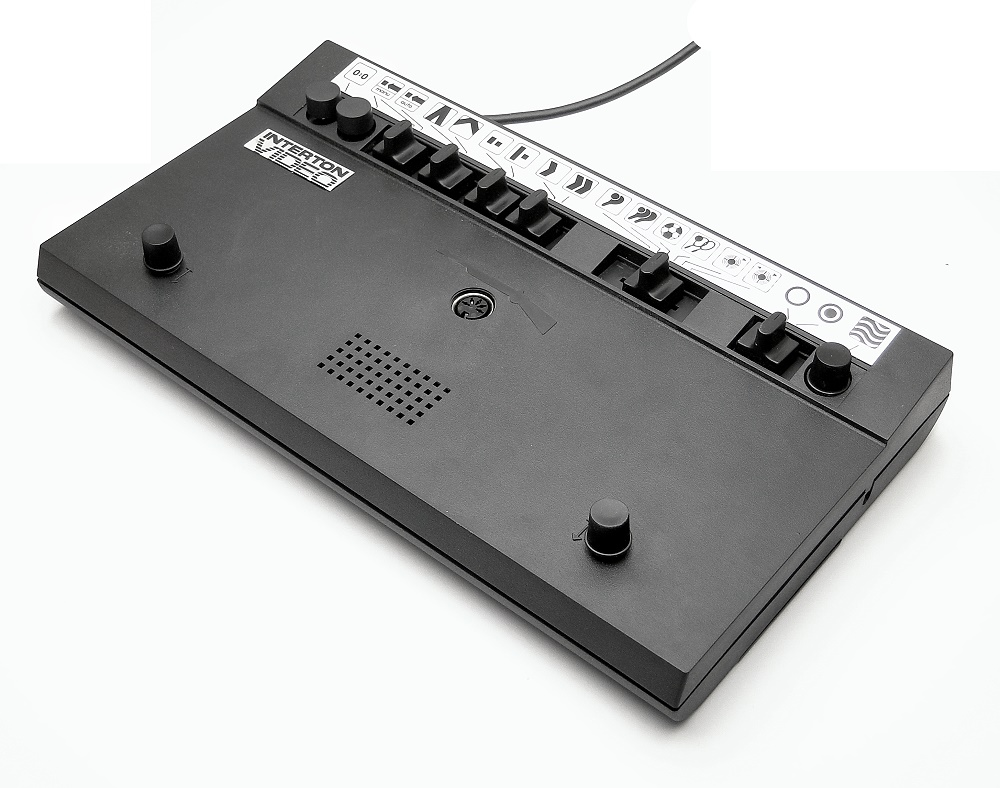
Interton Video 3000
(transverse control panel)

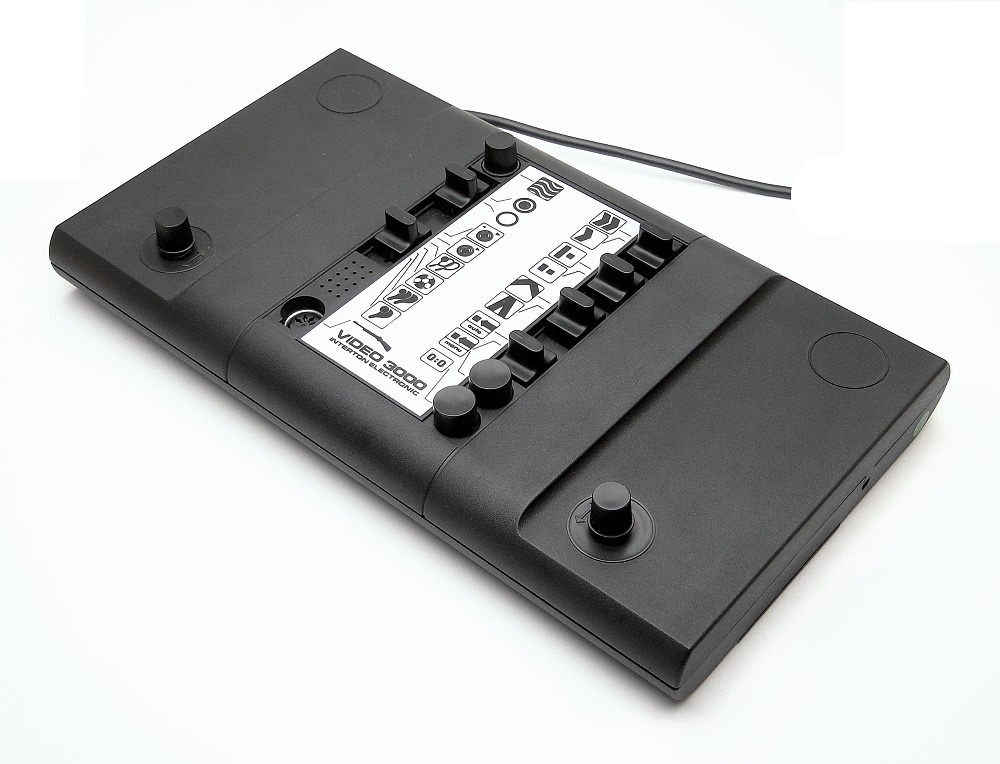
Interton Video 3000
(later version, Serie B)

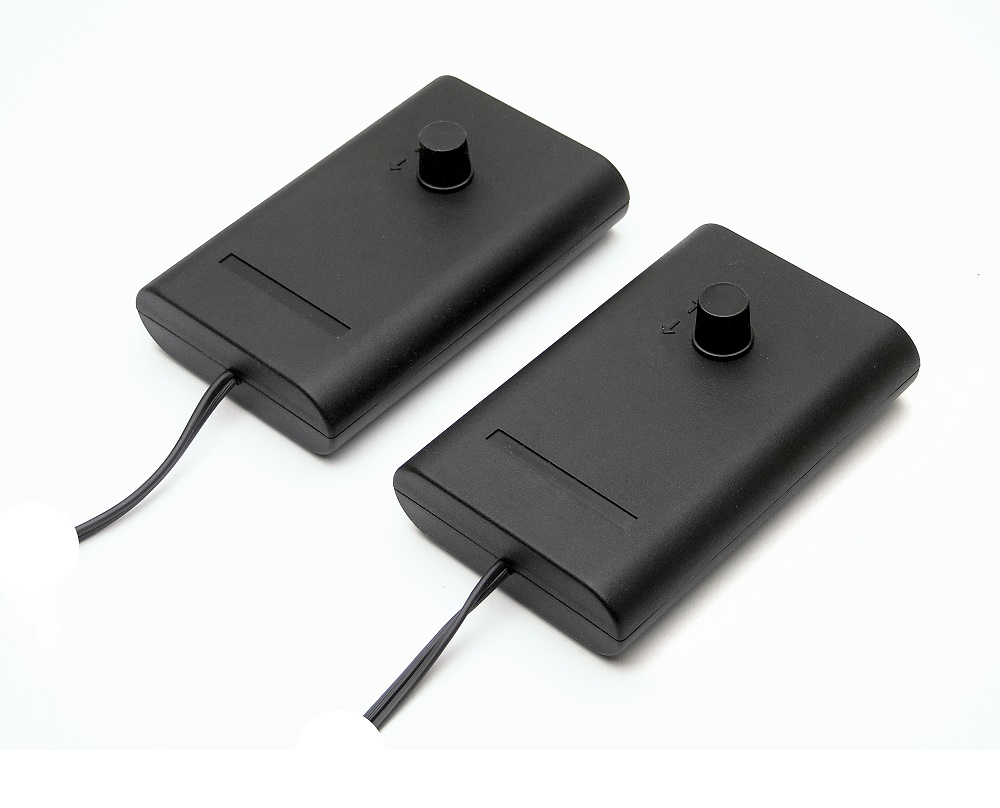
Interton-Fernbedienungen V350, optional controllers

== Club Exclusiv 2000 ==
In 1977, a special variant of the Interton Video 3000, called Club Exclusiv 2000, was released only in Germany. However, it did not show any Interton brand on the console. It was made by Interton and did not use a cartridge system like the Video 2000, instead it offered the same games as the Video 3000 but came with a set of remote controls with no controls built inside the main unit. For the Video 3000 you had to buy these remote controls (called Accessory V350) separately. The Club 2000 is a very rare collector's item today, as it is one of the very few blue Pong consoles worldwide.

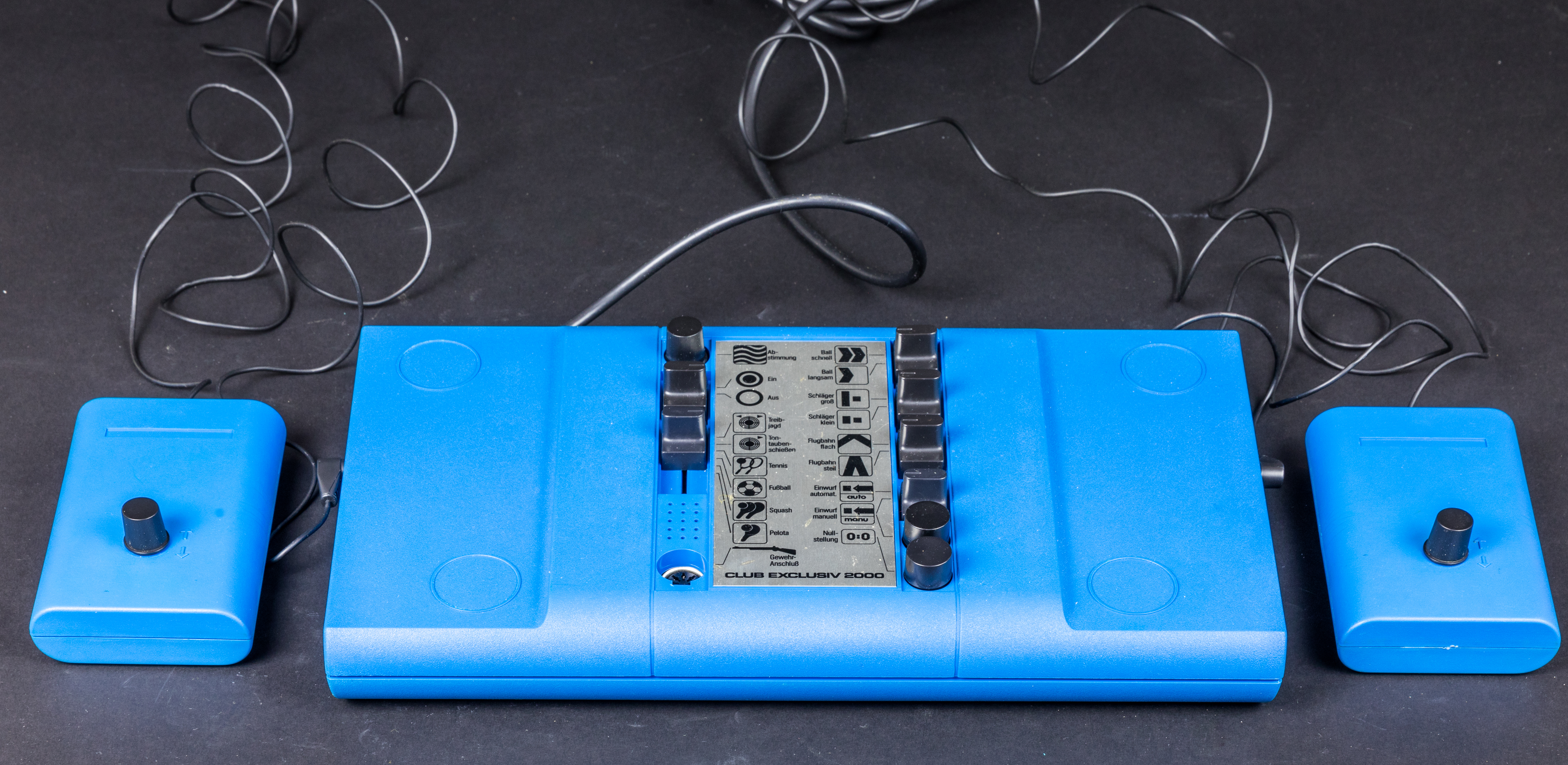
Club Exclusiv 2000
