= Interton Video 3001 =

First-generation home video game console

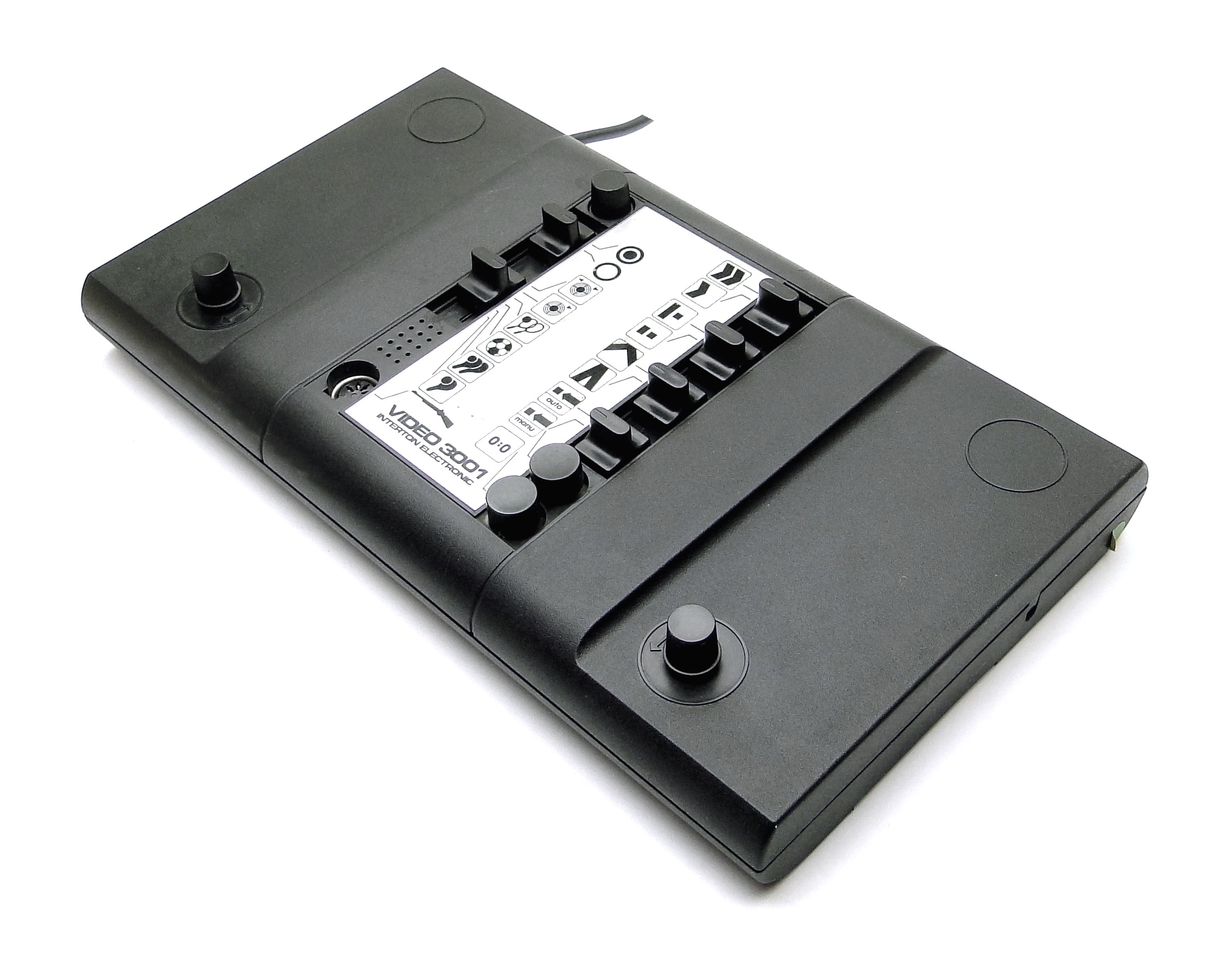
- Interton Video 3001 variant 1 (with TV channel selector knob)
- Manufacturer: Interton
- Type: Dedicated home video game console
- Generation: First generation
- Released: 1978
- Predecessor: Interton Video 3000
- Successor: Interton Video Computer 4000

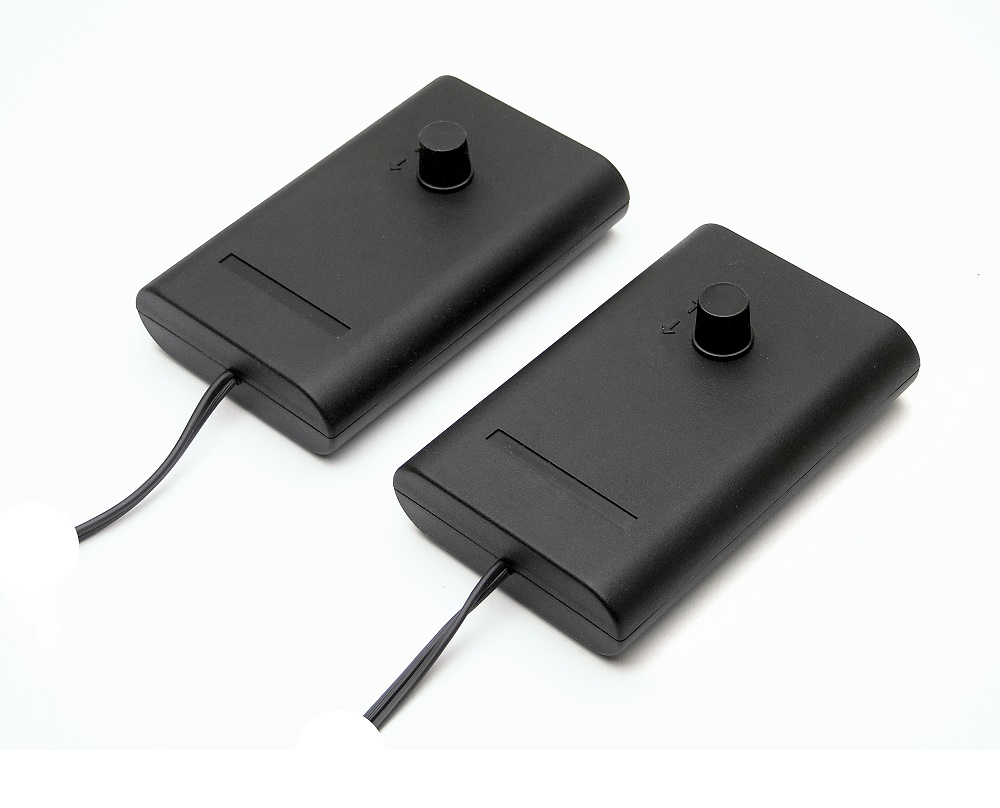
The two accompanying paddle–based game controllers (model number: V350)

The Interton Video 3001 is a dedicated first-generation home video game console that was released in 1978 by Interton. It is a Pong clone console and the successor to the Interton Video 3000 and the predecessor of the Interton Video Computer 4000 (VC 4000). It could output games in color. There are two variants of the console: the first with a knob that allow you to select the TV channel (35 or 40 UHF) and the second without.

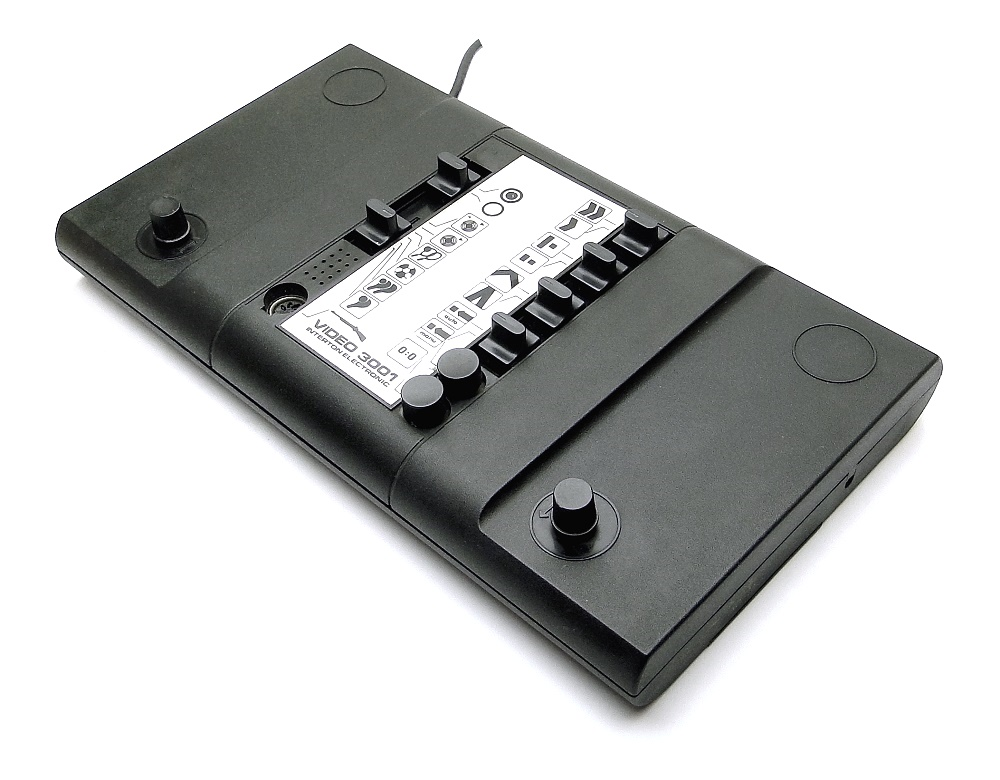
Variant 2 (without TV channel selector knob)

== Games ==
Due to the AY-3-8500 chipset, the following 6 games were available to players:

- Tennis
- Fussball
- Squash (pelota on the console manual)
- Squash als 2 Spieler Variante (squash on the console manual)
- Schießen 1 (treibjagd on the console manual)
- Schießen 2 ("tontauben-shiessen" on the console manual)
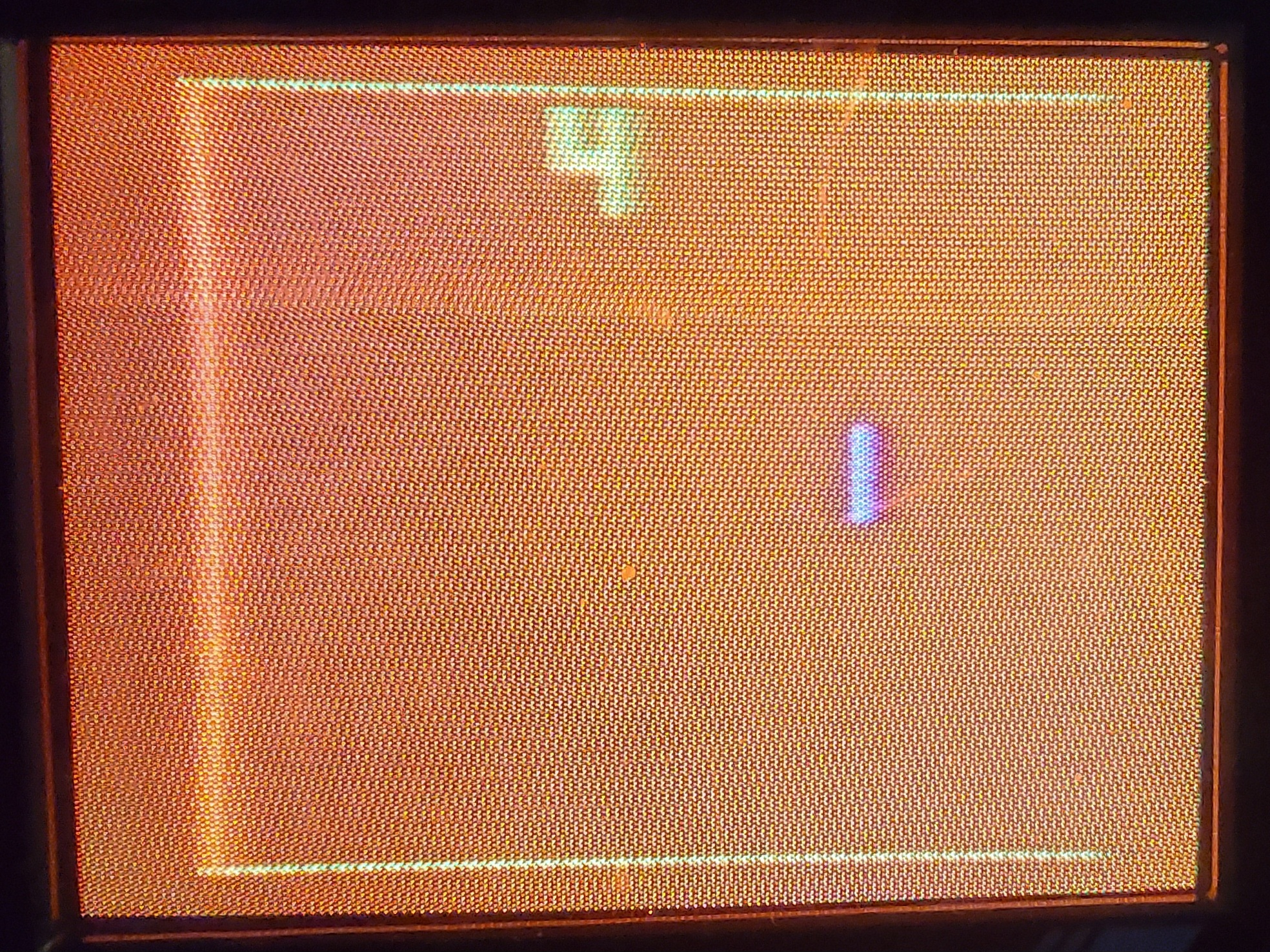
Screenshot Pelota

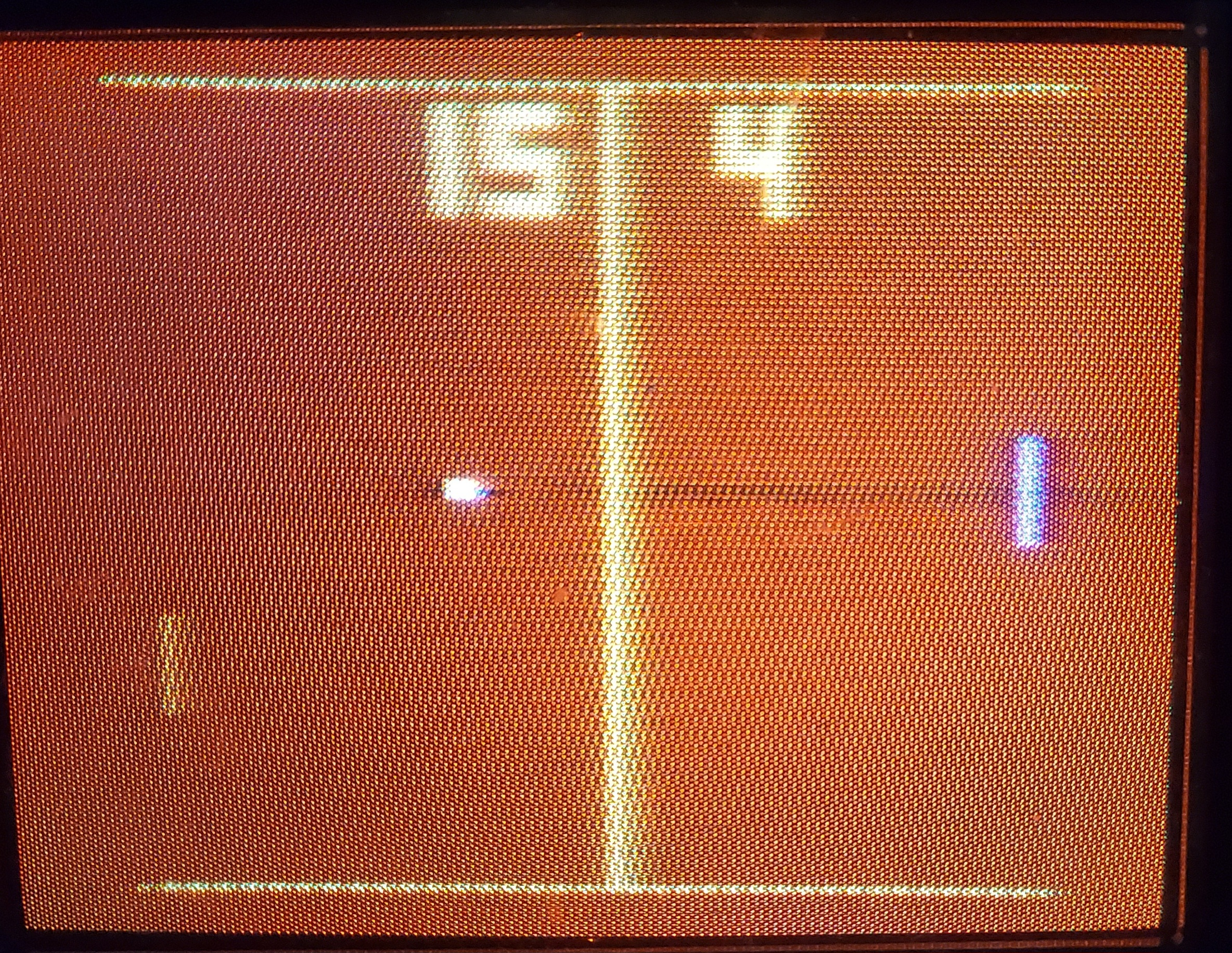
Screenshot Tennis

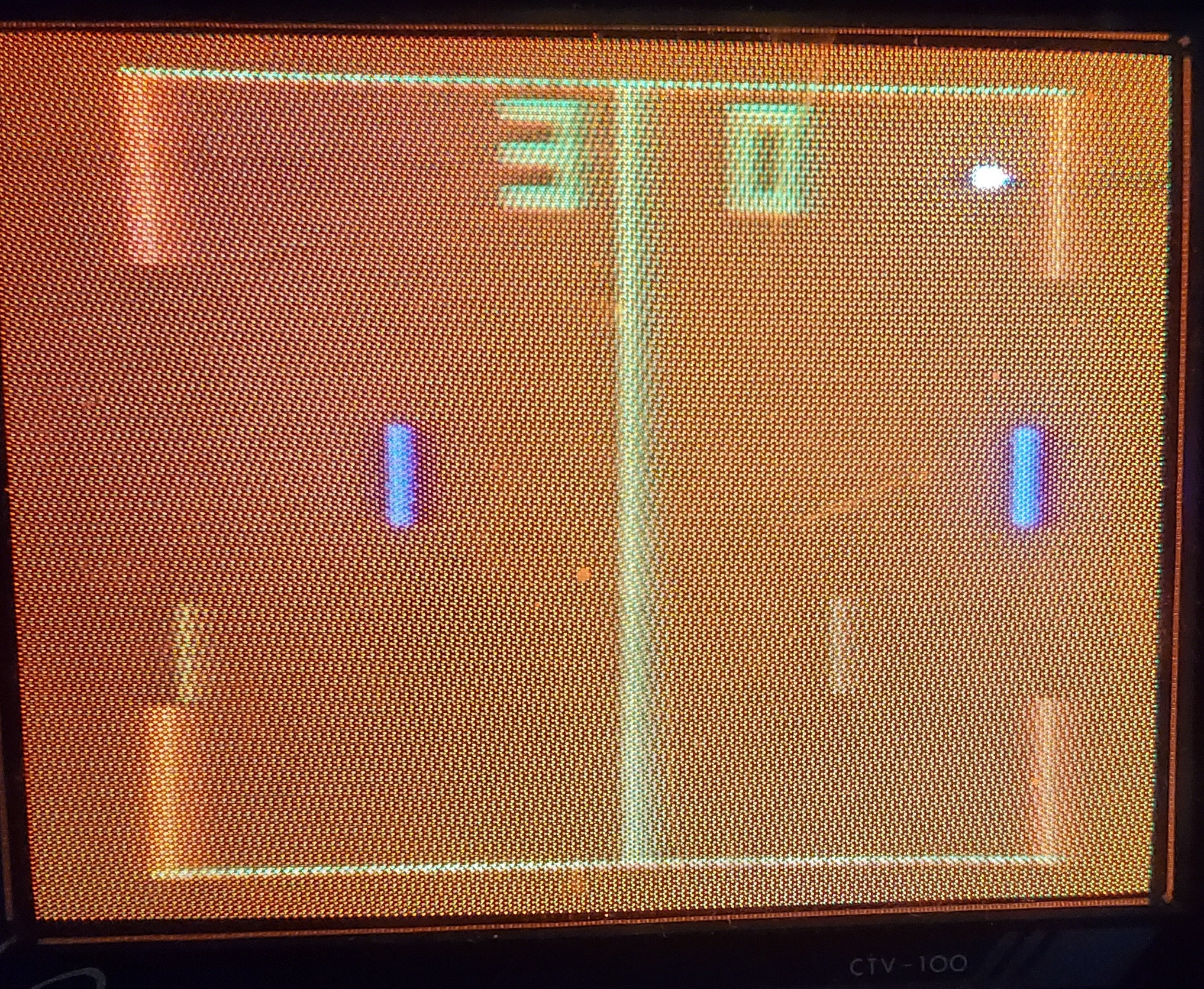
Screenshot Fussball

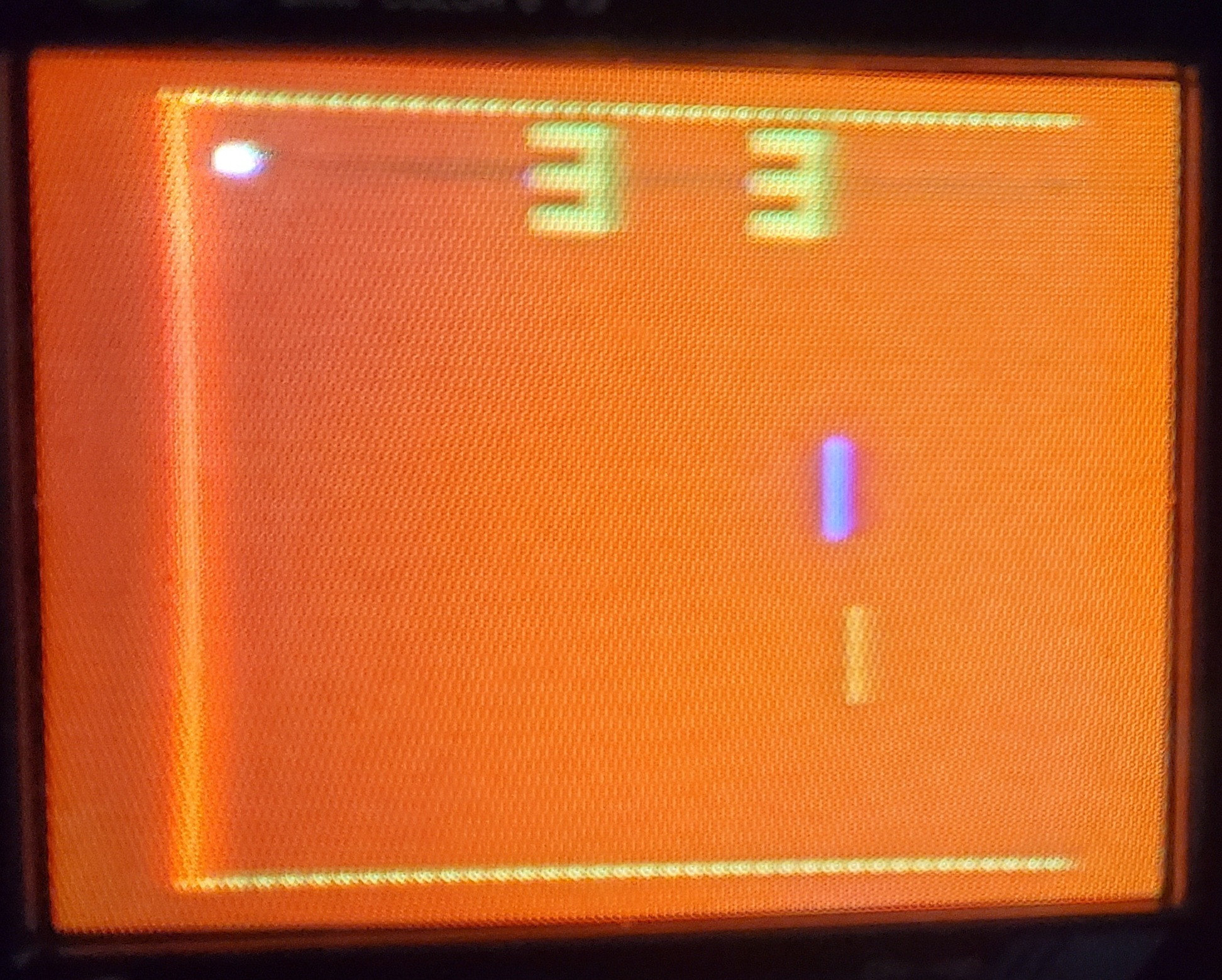
Screenshot Squash

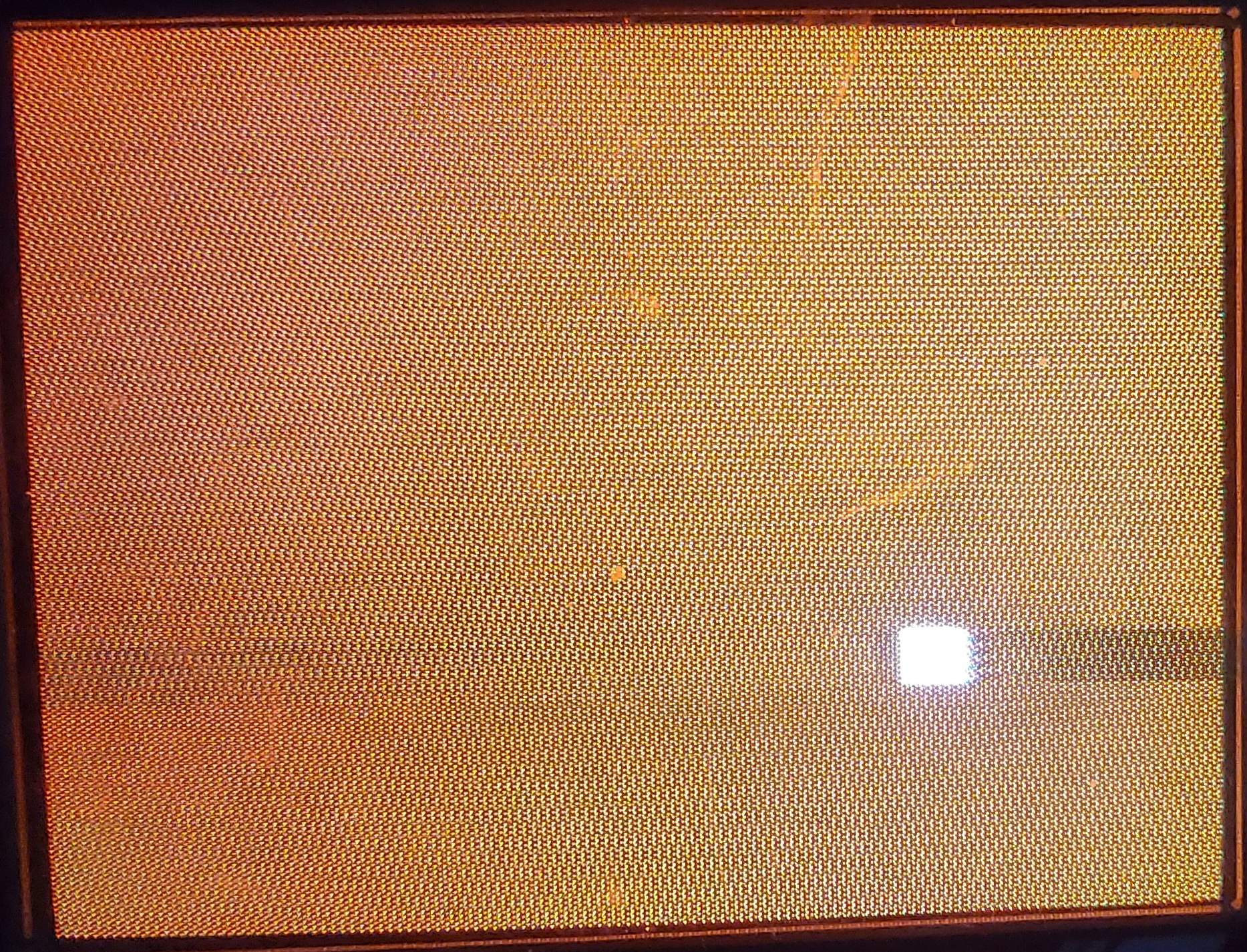
Screenshot Treibjagd
