= 1292 Advanced Programmable Video System =

Second-generation home video game console

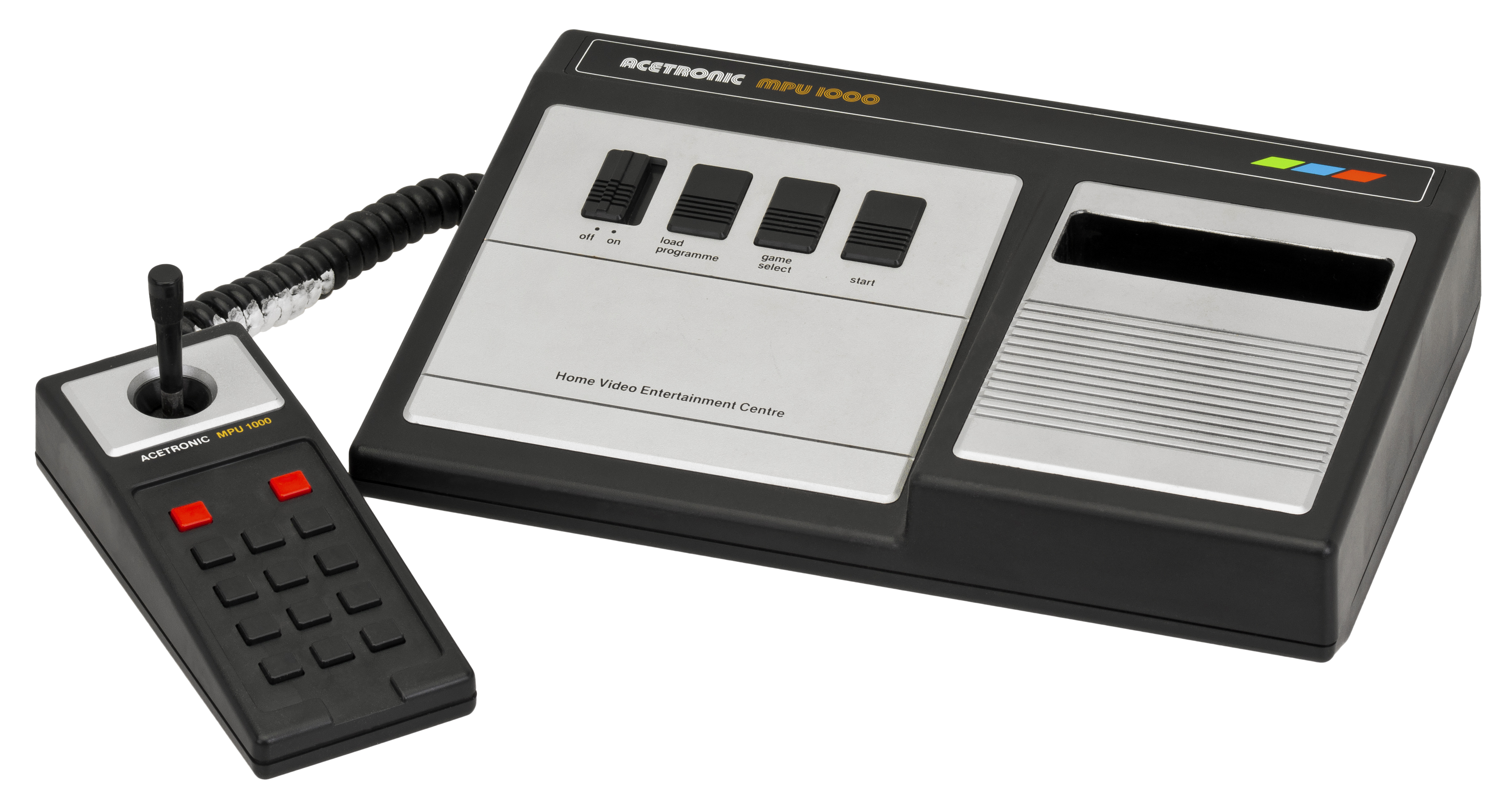
- An Acetronic MPU 1000 (right) and its controller
- Manufacturer: Radofin and others
- Type: Home video game console
- Generation: Second generation
- Released: 1979; 47 years ago
- Discontinued: 1983
- CPU: 8-bit Signetics 2650AI @ 0.887 MHz
- Memory: 43 bytes
- Removable storage: Cartridge 2k, 4k or 6k ROM, optional 1k RAM
- Graphics: Signetics 2636N @ 3.58 MHz
- Controller input: 2 × 12-button with 2-axis control stick
- Power: Input 250 V, 50 Hz; Output 9.5 V, 0.4 A & 15 V, 0.11 A

The 1292 Advanced Programmable Video System is a second-generation home video game console released by Hong Kong company Radofin in 1979. It is part of a group of software-compatible consoles which include the Interton VC 4000 and the Voltmace Database. The 1392 Advanced Programmable Video System included its power pack inside the console instead of an exterior power pack.

== Specifications ==
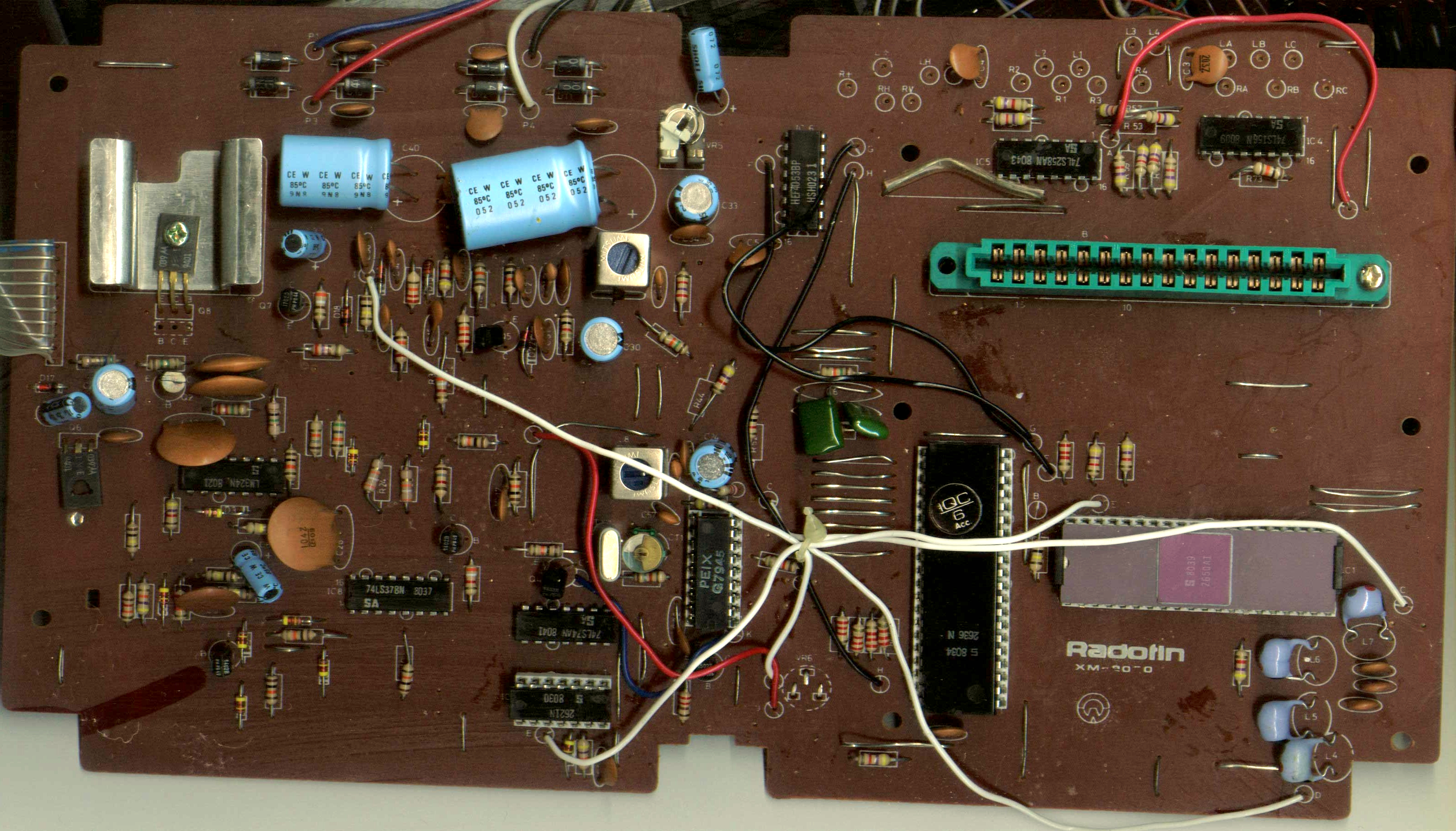
PCB scan of the Acetronic MPU-1000

- CPU: 8-bit Signetics 2650AI at 0.887 MHz
- Programmable video interface: Signetics 2636N at 3.58 MHz. This chipset was less powerful than the later model Signetics 2637N used in the Arcadia 2001.
- Data Memory: 43 bytes

=== Graphics ===
- Sprites: 4 single colour sprites (1 can be 8 colours)
- 1 score line displaying 4 BCD digits
- Background consisting of a series of alternating lines

=== Misc ===
- Games cartridges use a 2 KB or 4 KB ROM, with the exception of Chess II which uses a 6 KB ROM.
- Very basic arcade machine sound

=== User programming ===
An expensive £49 (equivalent to £288.01 in 2025 pounds) Hobby Module was available which had a monitor program in 2K of ROM, and 2K of RAM (256 bytes of scratchpad RAM for the monitor and 1792 bytes of RAM for user programs). It had a 5-pin DIN socket to allow software to be saved to a cassette tape player. This converted the unit into halfway between a home computer and an ordinary gaming console.

The user was expected to write the programs in Signetics 2650 assembly language on paper, hand assemble each instruction, and then enter the resulting hexadecimal machine code a byte at a time.

== Released versions ==
The console was produced by different companies and sold with different names. Although all variants have identical computational hardware, changes to the dimensions of the cartridge slot on some variants result in cartridges not always being interchangeable between systems. The following is a table of the console variants grouped by cartridge compatibility.

Name	Brand / Manufacturer	Country	Compatibility family	Notes	Image
1292 Advanced Programmable Video System	Radofin / Radofin	Germany	1292 Advanced Programmable Video System	Released in 1979. Known also as "Radofin Programmierbares Video System". Has an external power supply.	
1392 Advanced Programmable Video System	Radofin / Radofin	Europe	1292 Advanced Programmable Video System	Released in 1979. Has an internal power supply.	
HMG-1292 Advanced Programmable Video System	Hanimex / Radofin	Australia and New Zealand	1292 Advanced Programmable Video System		
HMG-1392 Advanced Programmable Video System	Hanimex / Radofin	Australia and New Zealand	1292 Advanced Programmable Video System		
Force 2	Fountain / Radofin	Australia and New Zealand	1292 Advanced Programmable Video System	Released in 1979.	
1292 Advanced Programmable Video System	Fountain / Radofin	Australia and New Zealand	1292 Advanced Programmable Video System	Released in 1979.	
1392 Advanced Programmable Video System	Fountain / Radofin	Australia and New Zealand	1292 Advanced Programmable Video System	Released in 1979. Has an internal power supply	
Advanced Programmable Video System	Grandstand / Radofin		1292 Advanced Programmable Video System		
Lansay 1392	Lansay / Radofin	Europe	1292 Advanced Programmable Video System	Released in 1979. Internal power supply.	
PP-1292 Advanced Programmable Video System	Audiosonic / Radofin	Europe	1292 Advanced Programmable Video System	Released in 1978.	
PP-1392 Advanced Programmable Video System	Audiosonic / Radofin	Europe	1292 Advanced Programmable Video System	Released in 1978. Has an internal power supply.	
VC-6000	Prinztronic / Radofin	United Kingdom	1292 Advanced Programmable Video System	Released in 1979.	
MPU-1000	Acetronic / Radofin	United Kingdom	1292 Advanced Programmable Video System	Released in 1979.	
MPU-2000	Acetronic / Radofin	United Kingdom	1292 Advanced Programmable Video System	Released in 1979.	
Database	Videomaster\Voltmace	United Kingdom	Database System		Voltmace Database System
Television Computer System	Rowtron	United Kingdom	Television Computer System	Released in 1979.	
Television Computer System	Teleng	United Kingdom	Television Computer System	Released in 1979.	
Jeu Video TV	Karvan	France	Video TV Game		
OC-2000	Societe Occitane Electronique	France	Video TV Game	Released in 1979.	
Vidéo Ordinateur MPT-05	ITMC	France	MPT-05	Released in 1983.	
Super Play Computer 4000	Grundig	Germany	Interton VC-4000		
VC 4000	Interton	Europe	Interton VC-4000	Released in 1978.	
CX-3000 Data Bass Sistem	Palson	Spain	Interton VC-4000		
Tele Computer	Aureac	Spain	Interton VC-4000	Palson CX-3000 clone.	
Video Computer H-21	TRQ	Spain	Interton VC-4000 (partial)	TRQ carts fit and work on Interton consoles. Interton carts don't fit in TRQ consoles.	

== Games ==
Although, not much information is known about the release dates of the cartridges, the total number of the games should be 59 (33 games released by Radofin between 1977 and 1978, 19 games for the Interton VC 4000 and compatibles after 1978, and 7 more games released around 1980).

Name	Size	Platform	Year
Air/Sea Attack / Air/Sea Battle	2K	Fountain #5 + Palson #9 + Interton #7	
Arcade (Voltmace)/Pinball (Interton)	2K	Interton #23 + Voltmace #20	
Backgammon	4K	Interton #36	
Basic Maths (Fountain)/Mathematics 1 (Interton)	2K	Fountain #7 + Interton #5	
Bat & Ball (Voltmace)/Olympics (Fountain)/Paddle Games (Interton/Palson)/Sportsworld (Rowtron)	2K	Fountain #1 + Interton #3 + Palson #1 + Rowtron #1 + Voltmace #3	
Blackjack	2K	Fountain #3 + Interton #2	
Bowling/Ninepins	2K	Interton #25	
Boxing (Voltmace)/Boxing Match (Interton)/Prizefight (Fountain)	4K	Fountain #14 + Interton #18 + Voltmace #13	
Brain Drain (Voltmace)/Codebreaker (Fountain)/Mastermind (Interton)	2K	Fountain #10 + Interton #16 + Voltmace #9	
Capture (Fountain)/Reversi (Interton)	2K	Fountain #24 + Interton #21	
Car Races	2K	Interton #1	
Casino	2K	Interton #31	
Challenge! (Acetronic)/Four in a Row (Interton)	2K	Acetronic #9 + Interton #15 + Voltmace #14	
Chess	4K	Interton #13	
Chess 2	6K	Interton #22	
Circus	2K	Fountain #13 + Interton #17 + Voltmace #12	
Cockpit	4K	Interton #28	
Come Come	4K	Palson #16	
Come-Frutas	4K	TRQ	
Come-Frutas (alternate version)	4K	TRQ?	
Cowboy	2K	Rowtron	1981
Crazy Crab	4K	Voltmace #29	
Draughts	4K	Interton #26 + Voltmace #22	
Electronic Pinball	2K	Fountain #25	
Golf	4K	Fountain #19 + Interton #27	
Grand Prix (Fountain)/Road Race (Voltmace)	2K	Fountain #2/Voltmace #4	
Head On	2K	Fountain #20	1981
Hippodrome	2K	Interton #11	
Hobby Module	2K	Radofin #16	1980
Horse Racing	2K	Fountain #12 + Voltmace #11	
Hunting	2K	Interton #12	
Hyperspace	2K	Interton #38	
Invaders	2K	Fountain #27	
Invaders	2K	Interton #32	
Labyrinth	2K	Interton #9	
Laser Attack	2K	Fountain #31	1981
Leapfrog	4K	Voltmace	1982
Math 2 (Fountain)/Mathematics 2 (Interton/Voltmace)	2K	Fountain #8 + Interton #6 + Voltmace #7	
Melody/Simon (Interton)/Musical Games (Fountain)/Musical Memory (Voltmace)	2K	Fountain #17 + Interton #20 + Voltmace #21	
Metropolis/Hangman	4K	Interton #29	
Monster Munchers	2K	Rowtron	
Motocross	4K	Interton #14	
Munch & Crunch	4K	Voltmace #24	1982
Planet Defender	2K	Fountain #33	1982
Shoot Out	2K	Fountain #29	1981
Shooting Gallery	2K	Fountain #6 + Voltmace #8	
Soccer	2K	Fountain #15	
Soccer	2K	Interton #24	
Solitaire	2K	Interton #30	
Space War (Fountain)/Outer Space Combat (Interton)/Galactic Space Battles (Rowtron)	2K	Fountain #30 + Interton #19 + Rowtron	
Spider's Web (Fountain)/Monster-Man (Interton)	4K	Fountain #22 + Interton #37	
Super Invaders	2K	Interton #33	
Super Knockout	2K	Fountain #26	1980
Super Maze (Fountain)/Maze (Palson/Voltmace)	2K	Fountain #11 + Palson #7 + Voltmace #10	
Super-Space	4K	Interton #40	
Tank Battle/Air Battle	2K	Interton #4	
Tank/Plane Battle (Fountain)/Tank & Plane (Voltmace)	2K	Fountain #4 + Voltmace #5	
Treasure Hunt (Fountain)/Memory 1/Flag Capture (Interton)	2K	Fountain #18 + Interton #8	
Winter Sports	4K	Interton #10	
