= Interton Video 2400 =

First-generation home video game console

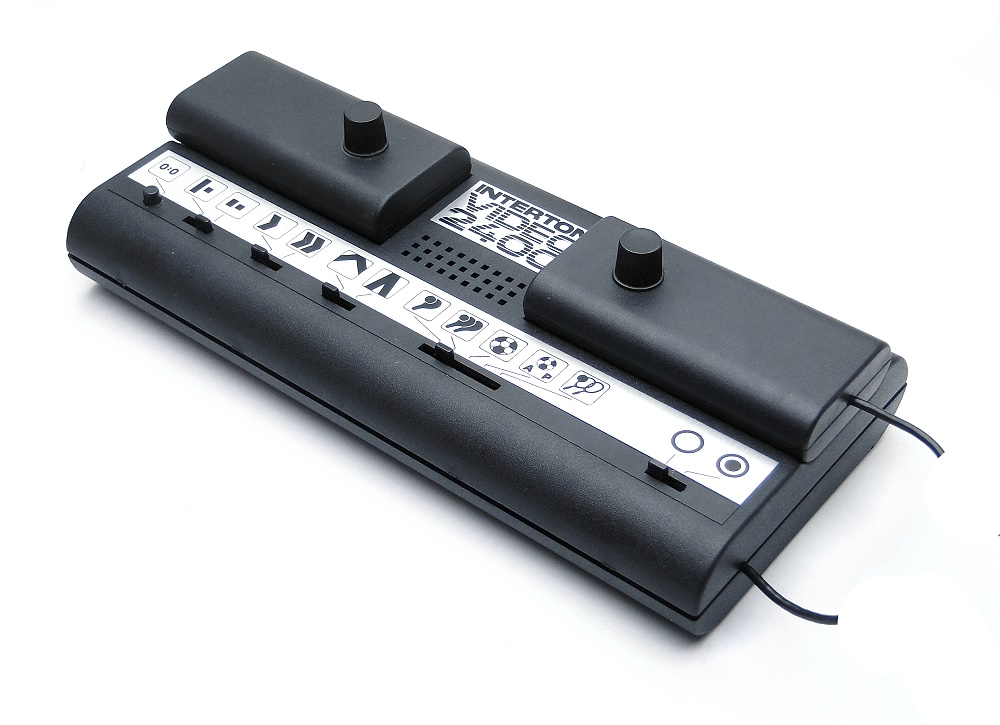
- An Interton Video 2400 with its two accompanying paddle-based game controllers
- Manufacturer: Interton
- Type: Dedicated home video game console
- Generation: First generation
- Released: 1975
- Sound: Played via internal speaker
- Predecessor: Interton Video 2000
- Successor: Interton Video 2501

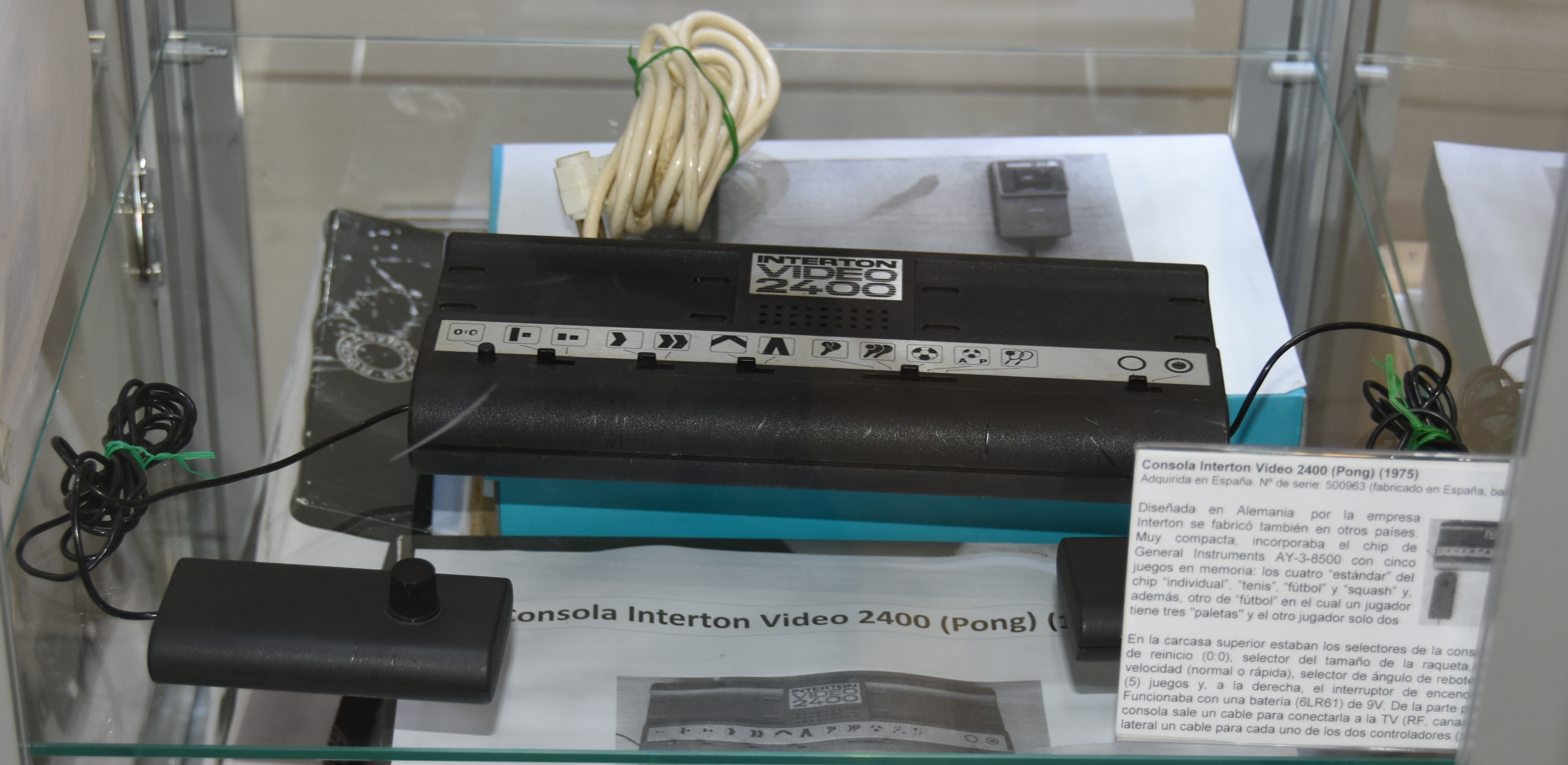
An Interton Video 2400 in a showcase

The Interton Video 2400 is a dedicated first-generation home video game console that was released in 1975 by Interton. It is the successor of the Interton Video 2000 and the predecessor of the Interton Video 2501. It could output only black and white. The console uses the AY-3-8500 chipset. (Note: Note that this chipset was made commercially officially available for the first time in 1976. However, it was designed in 1975: http://www.pong-story.com/coleco.htm) The sound is played through an internal speaker, rather than the TV set.

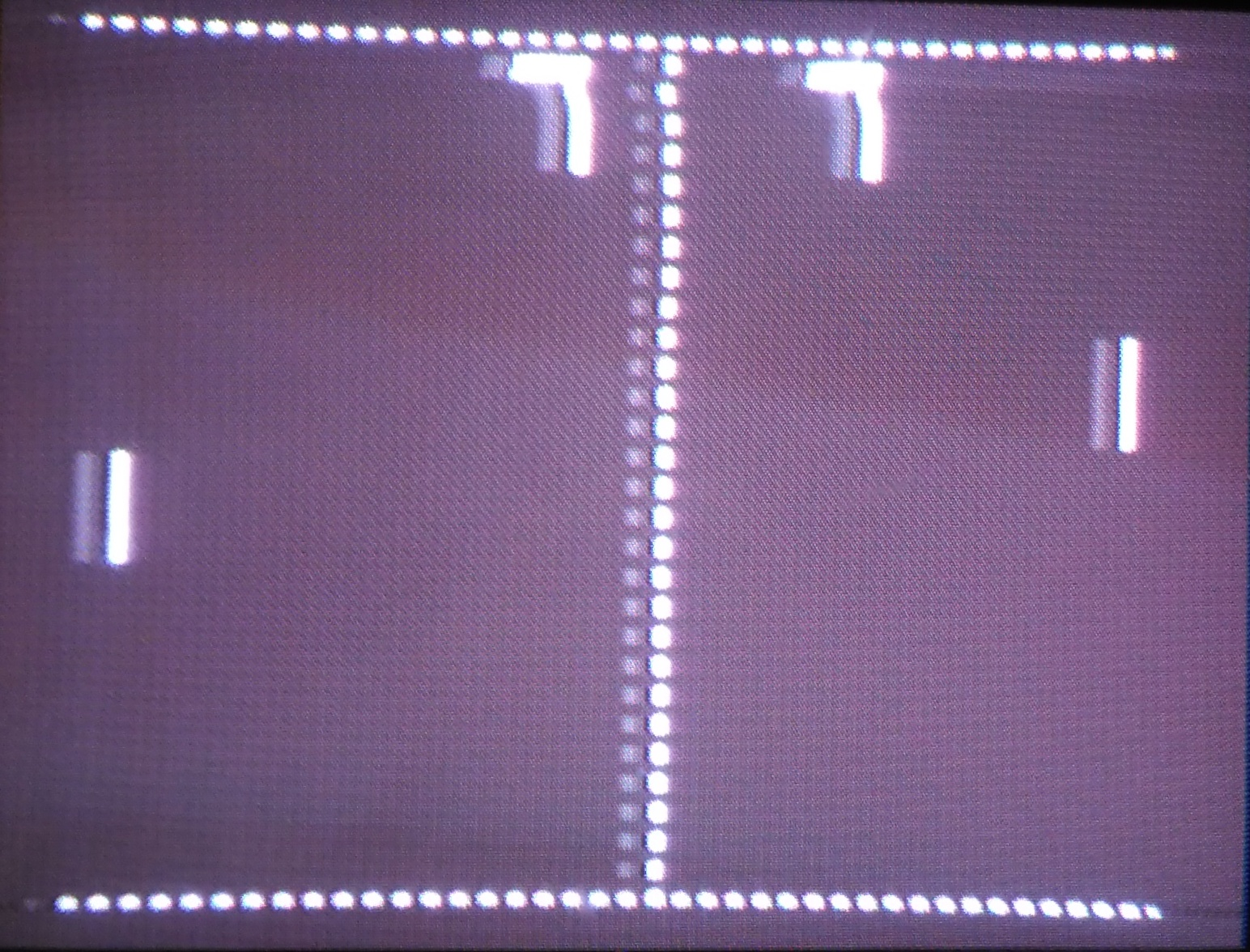
Screenshot Tennis

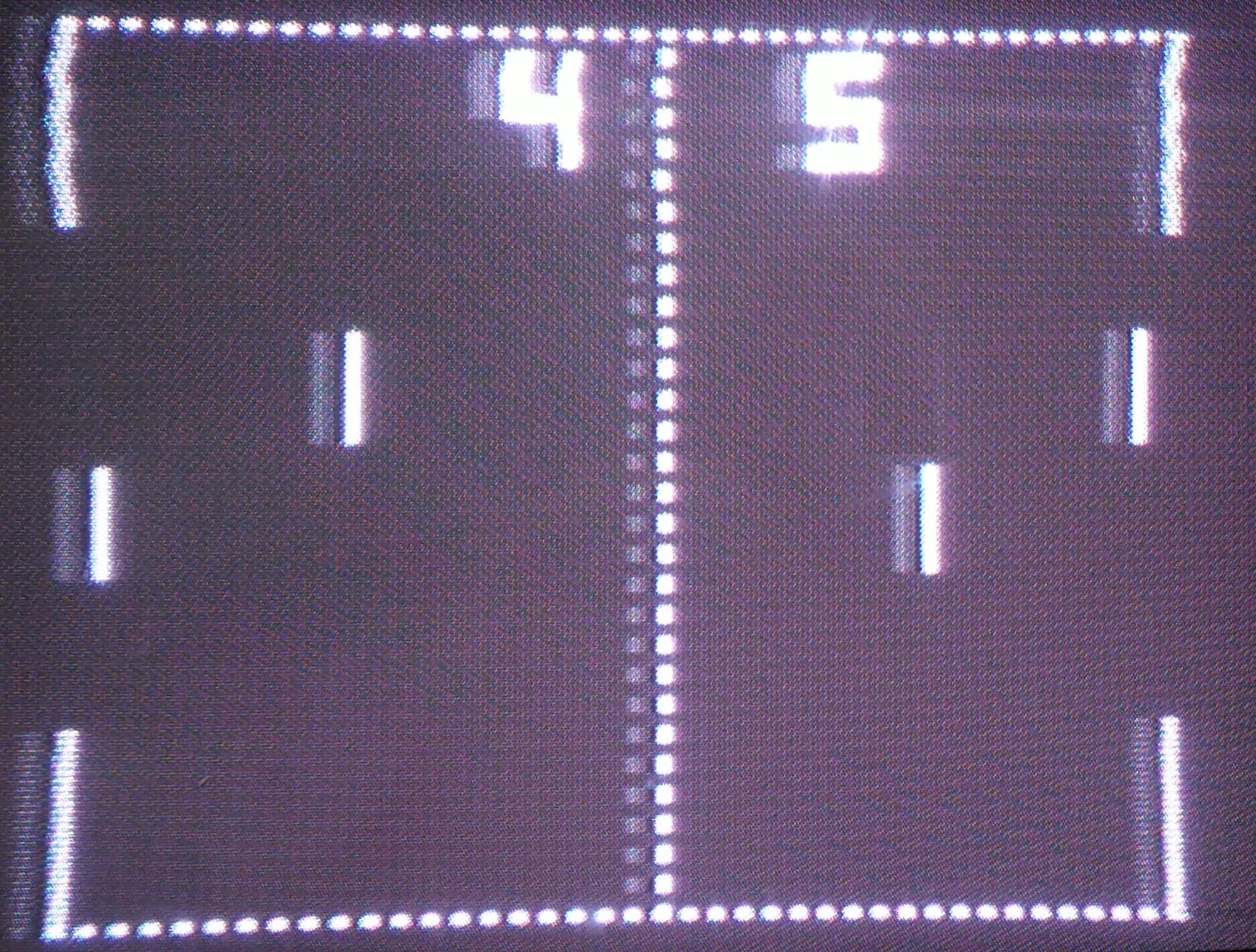
Screenshot Fußball

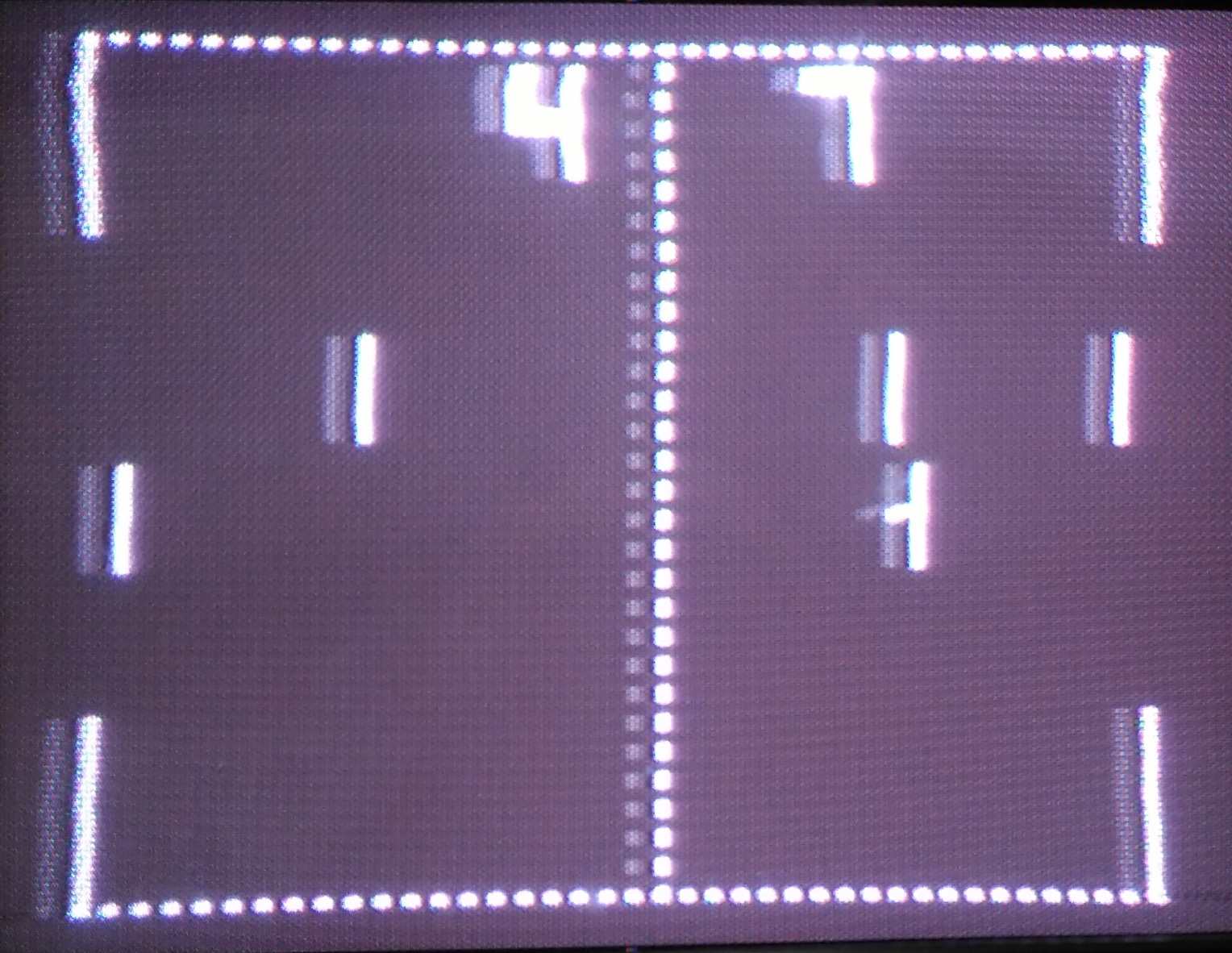
Screenshot Fußball Amateur/Profi

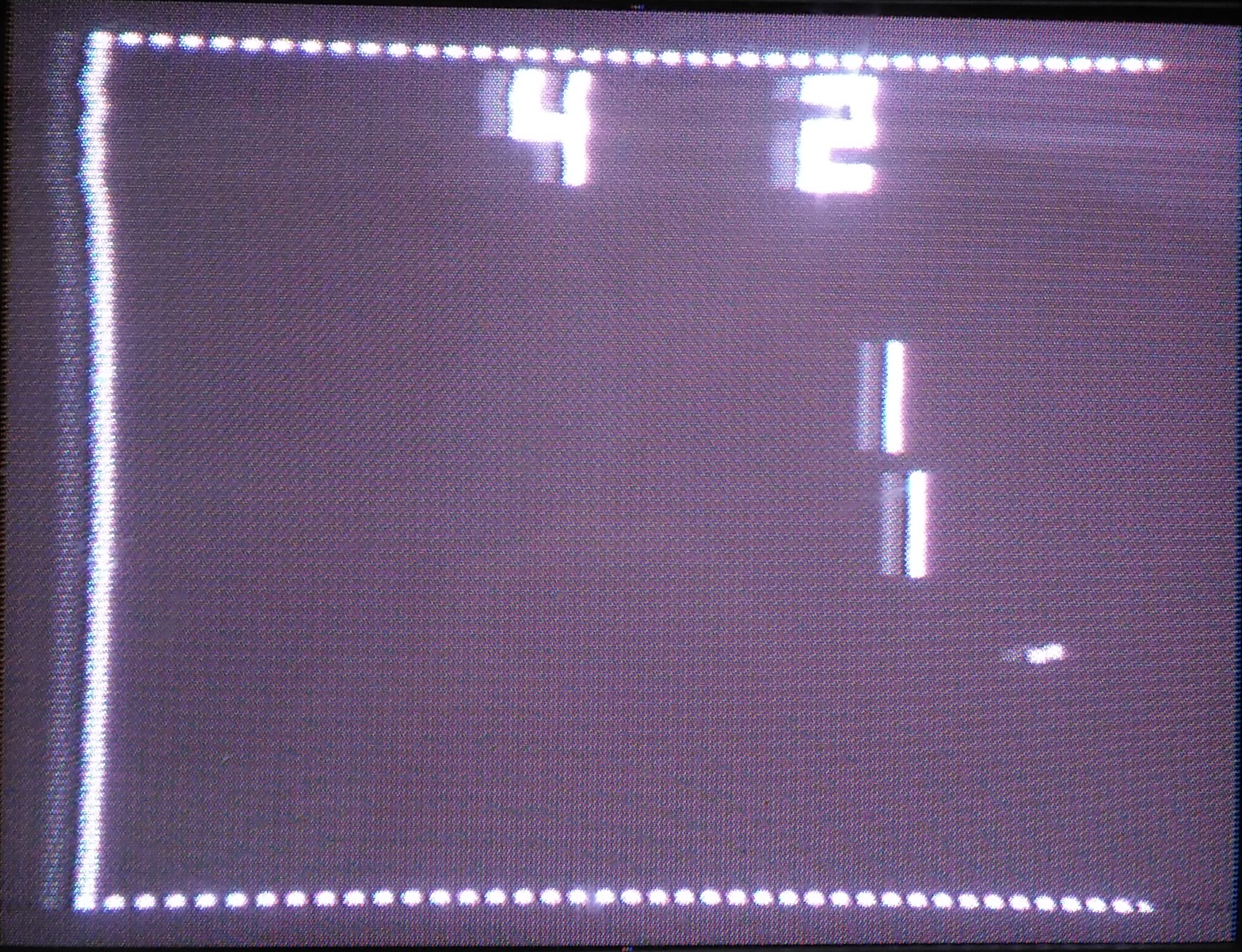
Screenshot Squash

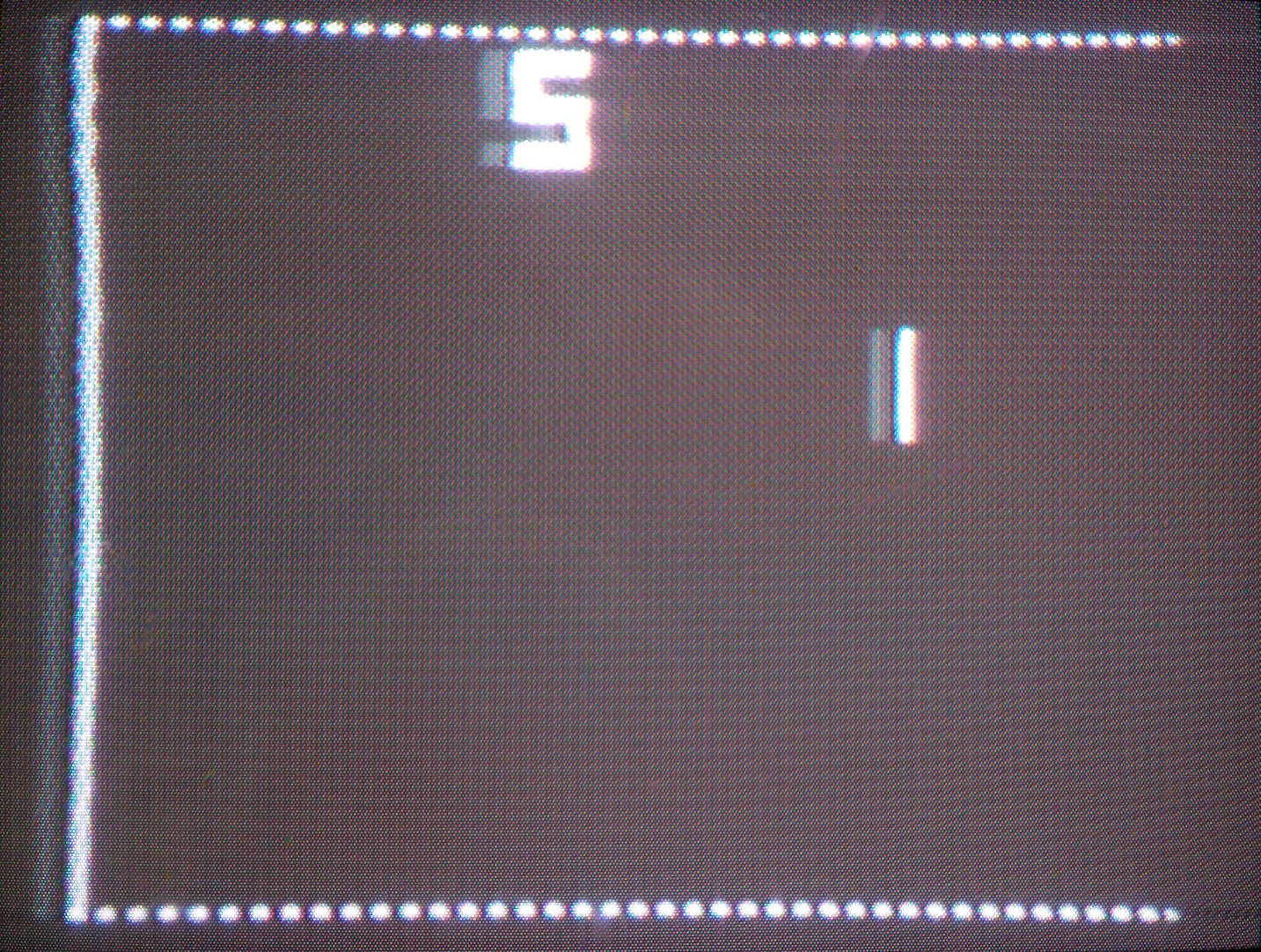
Screenshot Pelota

The console was also released in France by Thomson under the name JV1T and by Continental Edison under the name JV-2701.
