= Interton Video Computer 4000 =

Home video game console released by Interton in 1978

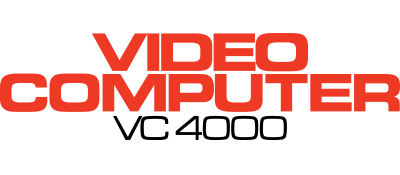

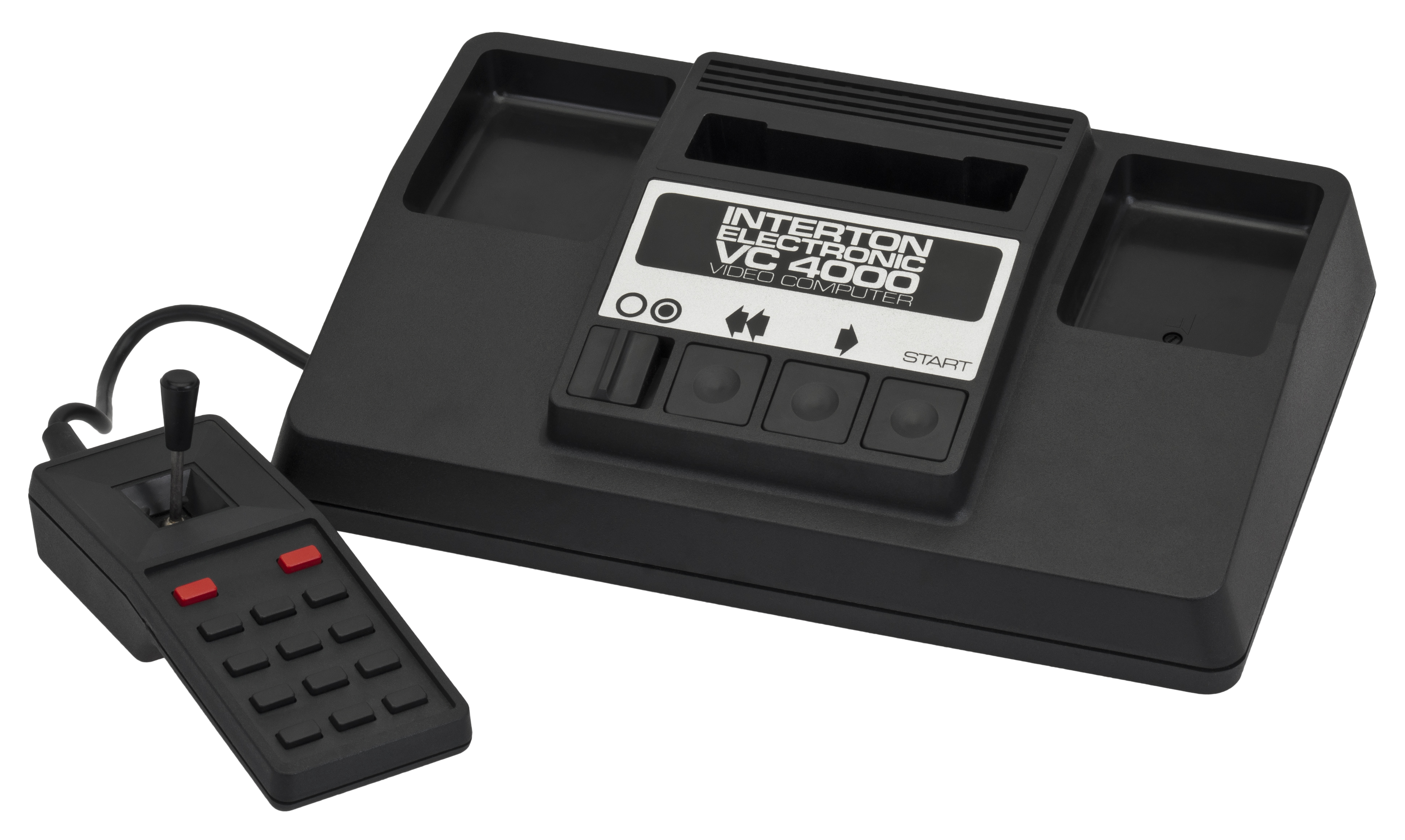
- An Interton VC 4000 with its accompanying game controller
- Also known as: Interton VC 4000 (abbreviation)
- Manufacturer: Interton
- Type: Home video game console
- Generation: Second generation
- Released: 1978; 48 years ago
- Introductory price: DM 298 (equivalent to DM 380.69 in 2021)
- Discontinued: 1983
- Units sold: Unknown
- Units shipped: Unknown
- CPU: Signetics 2650A
- Removable storage: Cartridges
- Graphics: Signetics 2636 video controller
- Input: 2 controllers with 12 buttons, 2 fire buttons and an analog joystick
- Weight: Unknown
- Best-selling game: Unknown
- Predecessor: Interton Video 3001
- Successor: None
- Related: 1292 Advanced Programmable Video System

Company logo

The Interton Video Computer 4000 (officially abbreviated as Interton VC 4000) is an 8-bit ROM cartridge-based second-generation home video game console that was released in Germany, England, France, Spain, Austria, the Netherlands and Australia in 1978 by German hearing aid manufacturer Interton. The console is quite obscure outside Germany, but many software-compatible systems can be found in numerous European countries (see versions of the 1292 Advanced Programmable Video System). The console is the successor of the Interton Video 3001 and was sold for 298DM and discontinued in 1983.

It is unknown if Interton designed and produced the Interton VC 4000 within their own rights, or if they were sold the rights to design and produce it. This is because many other foreign brands have produced "clones" of this system in the preceding years.

The Interton VC 4000's power comes from a Signetics 2650 CPU (which is the same as an Arcadia 2001) and a Signetics 2636 gaming video controller. Both controllers contain a 12-button keypad, two fire buttons, and a joystick. Inside the systems control panel, there are four different buttons: the ON/OFF switch, RESET, SELECT, and START.

== Released versions ==
The console was produced by different companies and sold with different names. Not every console is compatible with others due to differences in the shapes and dimensions of the cartridge slots, but all of the systems are software compatible. In the article about the 1292 Advanced Programmable Video System, there is a table with all the software-compatible consoles grouped by compatibility family (due to the slots).

== Technical specifications ==
- CPU: Signetics 2650A at 0.887 MHz
- Video controller: Signetics 2636
- Data memory: 37 bytes

== List of games ==
The games for the Interton VC 4000 were released on ROM cartridges known as cassettes that were sold for 40 to 50 Deutsche Mark each.

1. Cassette - Car Races
2. Cassette - Blackjack
3. Cassette - Paddle Games
4. Cassette - Tank Battle
5. Cassette - Mathematics I
6. Cassette - Mathematics II
7. Cassette - Air/Sea Battle
8. Cassette - Memory/Flag Capture
9. Cassette - Intelligence I
10. Cassette - Winter Sports
11. Cassette - Hippodrome
12. Cassette - Hunting
13. Cassette - Chess
14. Cassette - Motocross
15. Cassette - Intelligence II
16. Cassette - Intelligence III
17. Cassette - Circus
18. Cassette - Boxing Match
19. Cassette - Outer Space Combat
20. Cassette - Melody/Simon
21. Cassette - Intelligence IV/Reversi
22. Cassette - Chess II
23. Cassette - Pinball
24. Cassette - Soccer
25. Cassette - Bowling/Ninepins
26. Cassette - Draughts
27. Cassette - Golf
28. Cassette - Cockpit
29. Cassette - Metropolis/Hangman
30. Cassette - Solitaire
31. Cassette - Casino
32. Cassette - Invaders
33. Cassette - Super Invaders
34. Cassette - Space Laser (Unreleased)
35. Cassette - Rodeo (Unreleased)
36. Cassette - Backgammon
37. Cassette - Monster Man
38. Cassette - Hyperspace
39. Cassette - Basketball (Unreleased)
40. Cassette - Super-Space

== See also ==
- 1292 Advanced Programmable Video System, contains the software compatibility table of consoles
