= TVGC =

TVGC may refer to:

- TV Guide Channel, an American cable channel
- TV Games Computer, an early microcomputer
