= NE5532 =

Operational amplifier for audio applications

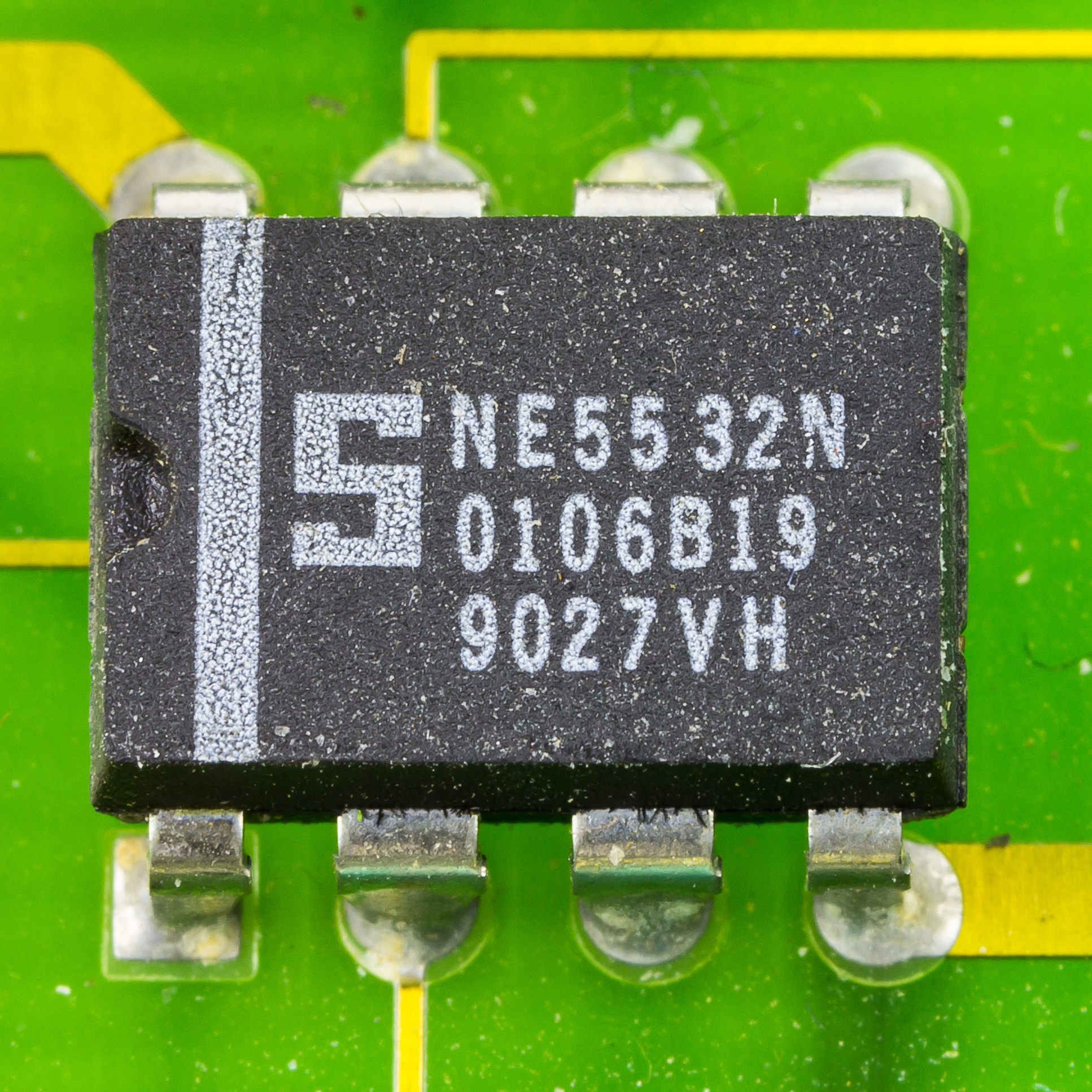
A genuine Signetics NE5532N in PDIP package, made in 1990, on a modem board

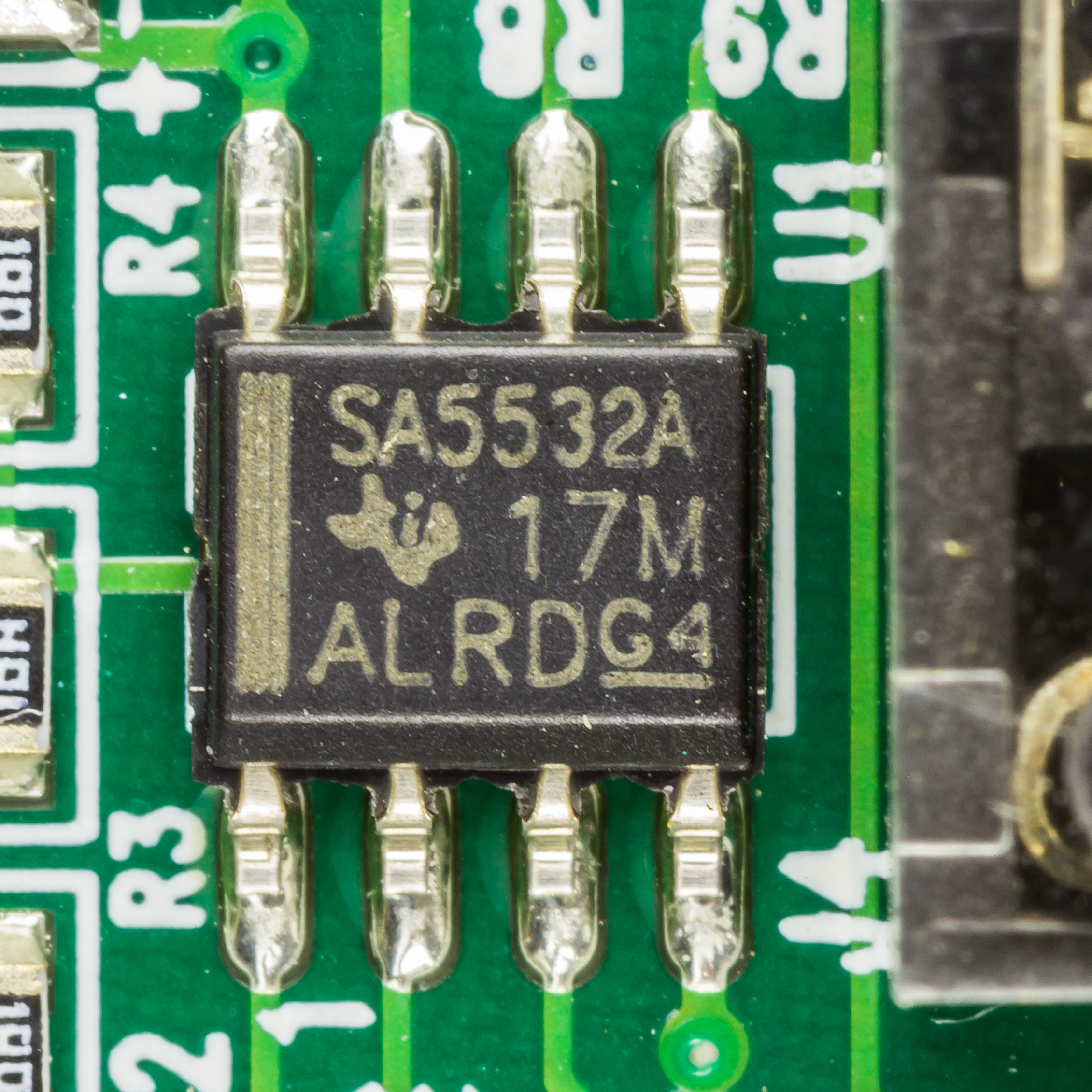
A Texas Instruments SA5532A in SOIC package on an audio distribution amplifier board

The NE5532, also sold as SA5532, SE5532 and NG5532 (commonly called just 5532) is a dual monolithic, bipolar, internally compensated operational amplifier (op amp) for audio applications introduced by Signetics in 1979. The 5532 and the contemporary TL072 were the first operational amplifiers that outperformed discrete class A circuits in professional audio applications. Due to low noise and very low distortion, the 5532 became the industry standard for professional audio. According to Douglas Self, "there is probably no music on the planet that has not passed through a hundred or more 5532s on its way to the consumer". The performance of the 5532 remained best in class for almost thirty years, until the introduction of the LM4562 in 2007. As of 2021, the 5532 remains in mass production as a generic product.

Unlike many other low-cost op amps, the 5532 exists only in a dual form, available in 8-pin PDIP, SO and SOIC packages. The single 5534, as well as the discontinued uncompensated dual 5533, is not fully compensated and is thus unstable at unity gain; the 5534 has lower noise density than the 5532 but is otherwise similar.

== History ==
The op-amp was originally made by Signetics and sold by Philips Semiconductors as TDA1034 and later renamed.

== Construction and operation ==
The 5532 is fully bipolar, with the exception of a sole JFET within a bias generator. Although the manufacturers did not release a first-hand explanation of its operation, the schematic has been public for decades. The signal path consists of two consecutive differential stages, a single-ended common emitter voltage amplification stage, and a class B push-pull output follower with a current-sensing overload protection. There are four internal compensation capacitors. The distortion "signature" (that is, the virtual absence of it) of the 5532 is defined largely by the three nested frequency compensation loops wrapped around the second and the third stages.

=== Input requirements ===
The input stage uses NPN transistors, thus the input bias currents flow into their bases, and cause negative voltage drop across the ground-to-input resistance. A typical 200 nA bias current flowing through a typical 47 kOhm resistor, for example, will cause a 10 mV voltage drop. These fairly stable shifts in operating points are usually not a concern. If possible, audio designers would allow them to accumulate over several stages, and then block the accumulated DC offset with a single output capacitor. Bias currents may not be allowed to flow through potentiometers, as it causes excessive crackling noise when the wipers are moved.

The inputs of the 5532 are protected with back-to-back diodes rated for currents up to 10 mA; these may open during fast input signal transients, and cause harsh output distortion. The 5532 is intended for linear operation only, and should not be used as a comparator, or otherwise subjected to large differential input voltages.

A typical 5532 operating from ±15 V supply rails retains linearity as long as the input voltages remains within ±13 V range. When common-mode voltage exceeds +13 V or goes below -13 V, the 5532 clips but remains operational as long as either input stays within the power supply voltages. Input overdrive does not cause output phase inversion which is common to the TL072 op amp.

=== Power supply requirements ===
The 5532 stands out among audio op amps in having an unusually high absolute maximum supply voltage rating of 44 V (compared to more common 36 V). In practice, each of the two amplifiers draws a fairly high 4–5 mA supply current, and the plastic package becomes appreciably warm at 34 V supply voltage. According to Douglas Self, using power supplies of more than 34 V is potentially unsafe, and certainly incompatible with most other op amps. At least one major manufacturer of the 5532 have since 2025 changed the internal topology of their 5532 to a version which cannot handle more than 36V supply voltage.

The 5532 is sensitive to power supply AC decoupling; failure to decouple leads to erratic internal high-frequency oscillation that does not propagate to the output directly, but causes apparent distortion. A single 0.1 μF high-quality capacitor, connected across the power supply pins and near to them, is normally sufficient to prevent such oscillations. The manufacturers recommend using two such capacitors, connected between each power supply pin and the ground; according to Douglas Self, this is not necessary and sometimes undesirable due to the risks of injecting noise currents into the signal ground.

=== Distortion ===
The 5532 attains lowest total harmonic distortion (THD) in an inverting (shunt-feedback) configuration with moderate gain and moderate signal levels, where the THD does not exceed 0.0005% throughout the audio frequency spectrum. High source impedances inject added thermal noise, but do not affect the THD of the inverting amplifier. Increasing output level to 10 V does not affect performance through most of the audio frequency, except for the octave above 10 kHz where the THD rises to 0.001%. For comparison, the classic μA741 can deliver the rated 0.001% THD only at frequencies below 100 Hz; above the 100 Hz mark the THD continuously increases, reaching 1% at around 20 kHz.

In the non-inverting (series-feedback) configuration driven with a low-impedance source the 5532 demonstrates mild common-mode distortion. This form of distortion is most prominent at unity gain, but even there THD remains under 0.002% as long as the source impedance does not exceed 2 kOhm. The reported "sweet spot" lies around 1 kOhm source impedance, although this may be dependent on the manufacturer. As source impedances increase to 10 kOhm and beyond, 5532 performance radically worsens. Distortion is now dominated by components that are proportional to the square of common-mode signal voltage. Worst-case THD may exceed 0.02% at the treble end of the audio range.

=== Noise ===
The 5532, like all bipolar-input op amps, has significant current and voltage noise densities, typically 5 nV/Hz^{1/2} and 0.7 pA/Hz^{1/2}, respectively, at 1 kHz. Even accounting for the increase in noise densities at lower frequencies, voltage noise and current noise over the 20 kHz audio bandwidth do not exceed 1 μV and 100 pA, respectively. The three noise components — differential voltage noise referred to inputs, inverting input current and non-inverting input current — are assumed to be uncorrelated with each other. In reality there is some correlation, but its effect is insignificant.

Current and noise densities of the far more expensive bipolar-input OP27 and OP270, as well as the 5534, are only about 2–3 dB lower. The LM4562 has half the voltage noise of the 5532, but more than twice current noise. FET input devices have much higher voltage noise densities but practically nonexistent current noise The extremely low-noise LT1028 is nominally 15 dB quieter than the 5532, but is otherwise poorly suited for audio applications. The choice of the "lowest noise op amp" ultimately depends on which form of noise, voltage noise or current noise, is most critical in a specific application.

== NE5534 ==
The 5534 single operational amplifier is schematically identical to one half the 5532, with marginally different values of the internal compensation capacitors. The difference, however, is large enough to decompensate the amplifier. The 5534 is stable only at closed-loop gain of 3 and more. The slew rate is accordingly higher, typically 13 V/μs compared to 9 V/μs of the 5532; the unity gain crossover frequency is also higher, at around 30–50 MHz. The unity gain bandwidth of 10 MHz, same as for the 5532, is quoted for a fully compensated amplifier (implying the use of an external compensation capacitor). The input-referred noise densities are marginally lower. In practical applications, particularly large professional audio consoles, these advantages were not as important as was the added complexity, so the single 5534 did not see as much use as the dual 5532. The third IC in the family, the dual uncompensated 5533, has been long discontinued.

For unity-gain stability, the 5534 requires an external compensation capacitor of at least 22 pF for the non-inverting circuit, and 11 pF or more for the inverting circuit. Compensation inevitably decreases slew rate, compromising response to fast signal transients. This is unimportant in audio equipment, where the worst-case, theoretical slew rate at maximum output swing barely exceeds 2 V/μs. In more demanding applications, stability and high slew rate may be maintained simultaneously with the help of a lead-lag RC network between the 5534 inputs. The corner frequency of lead-lag network is normally selected at around 3–5 MHz, one decade below the unity gain crossover frequency. The regular compensation capacitor must remain, but its value can be safely decreased to 3 pF at unity gain.
