= Absolute phase =

Absolute phase is the phase of a waveform relative to some standard (strictly speaking, phase is always relative). To the extent that this standard is accepted by all parties, one can speak of an absolute phase in a particular field of application.

== Sound reproduction ==
In the reproduction of sound by headphones or speakers, absolute phase refers the phase of the reproduced signal relative to the original signal, retaining the original polarity. A positive pressure on the microphone is reproduced as a positive pressure by the loudspeaker or headphones driver. For instance, the plosive "p" sound from a vocalist sends an initial positive air pressure wave toward the microphone which responds with an initial inward movement of the microphone diaphragm, away from the vocalist. To maintain absolute phase, a loudspeaker reproducing the sound would send an initial positive pressure outward from the loudspeaker, toward the listener.

In audio, a change in polarity refers to an equal phase shift of 180° at all frequencies, usually produced on one channel by reversing the connections of two wires. Some audiophiles claim that reversing the polarities of all the channels simultaneously makes a subtle perceptible difference in the reproduced sound, even though the relative phases of all the channels are preserved. The ear is sensitive to the periodicity of a waveform at low frequencies; tests have shown that absolute phase can sometimes be heard by test subjects listening with monaural conditions (a single loudspeaker, or headphones sending the same signal to both ears.) Audio engineer Douglas Self concludes "there is a prima facie case for the audibility of absolute phase", especially for high impulse sounds such as percussion. The concept of absolute phase is rendered irrelevant for any instrument with strings (such as a guitar or piano), or for two or more instruments played together. Complex sounds such as these are known to have an undetectable phase relationship. In practice, the absolute phase of an audio system can be assumed to be inaudible.

== Power electronics ==
When dealing with power electronics, the phase of the voltage and current at various points in the system relative to one another are important. If the points of interest are widely separated in space, it can be difficult to measure the relative phase. To solve this problem, the phase of the signals relative to absolute time (UTC) is measured using instruments relying on GPS. Comparison of two absolute phases in this sense allows the relative phase of distant signals to be computed.

== Signal processing ==
In signal processing a pulse or finite wavetrain can be considered as a signal of a single frequency modulated by an envelope, or as a superposition of an infinite number of infinitesimal waves of different frequencies. In the first case, one may speak of the phase of the wave with respect to the envelope as the absolute phase. In the second picture, it is a question of the relative phase of the component frequencies. For examples of physical effects due to the phase of signals with the same power spectrum.
