= Signetics 8X300 =

Signetics microprocessor

General information
- Launched: 1976; 50 years ago
- Designed by: Scientific Micro Systems (SMS)
- Common manufacturer: Signetics; Landsdale Semiconductor

Performance
- Max. CPU clock rate: to 8 MHz
- Data width: 16 instruction, 8 data
- Address width: 13 instruction, 1 data

Physical specifications
- Package: 50-pin DIP

Architecture and classification
- Number of instructions: 8

History
- Successor: 8X305

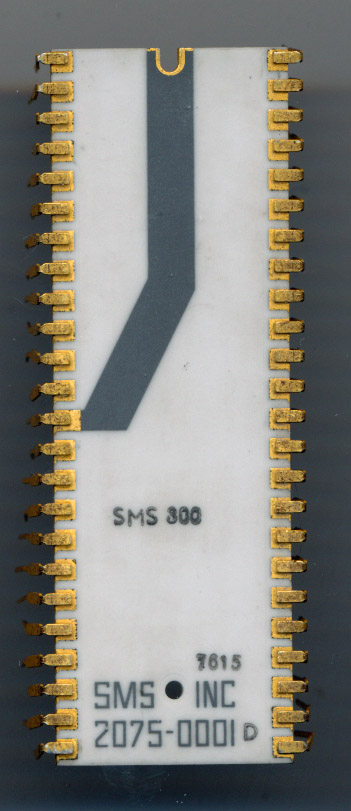
SMS 300, early 1976

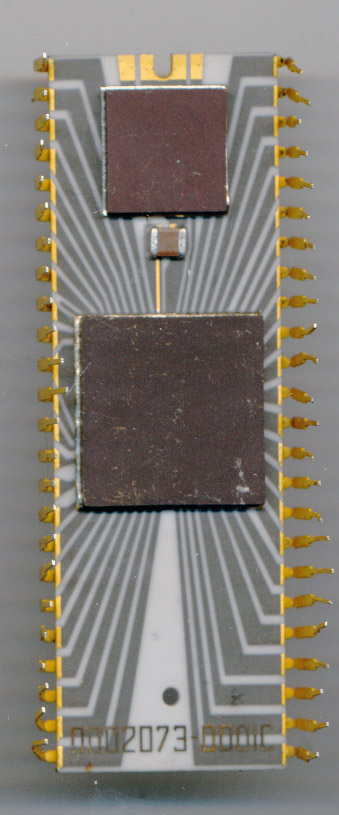
Underside of SMS 300 showing separate power regulator

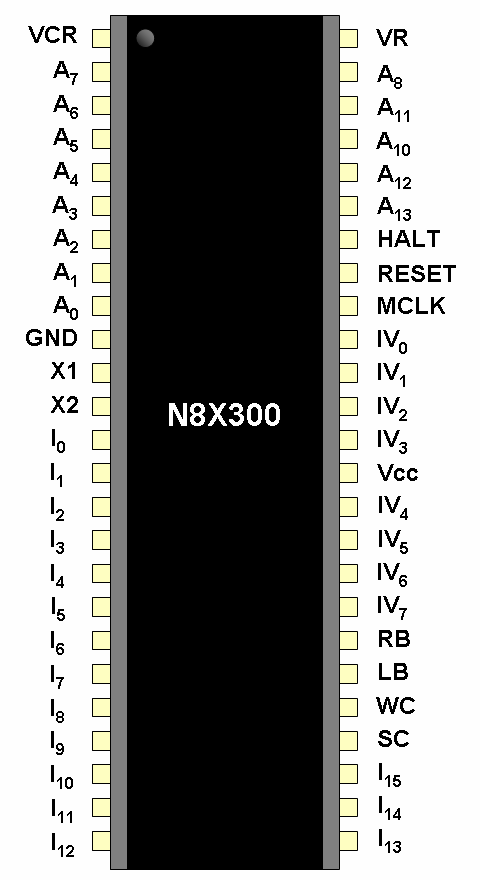
8X300 pinout

The 8X300 is a microprocessor produced and marketed by Signetics starting 1976 as a second source for the SMS 300 by Scientific Micro Systems, Inc. Although SMS developed it, Signetics was the sole manufacturer. In 1978 Signetics purchased the rights to the SMS 300 series and renamed it 8X300.

It was designed to be a fast microcontroller and signal processor, and because of this differs considerably from conventional NMOS logic microprocessors of the time. Perhaps the major difference was that it was implemented with bipolar Schottky transistor technology, and could fetch, decode and execute an instruction in only 250 ns. Data could be input from one device, modified, and output to another device during one instruction cycle.

A clone of the 8X300 was manufactured in the Soviet Union under the designation KM1818VM01 (Russian: КМ1818ВМ01).

In 1982, Signetics released an improved and faster version, the 8X305.

== Architecture ==
The device was supplied in a 50-pin DIL ceramic package and runs from a single 5V supply rail. An external pass transistor is required to complete an on-chip voltage regulator, which supplies 3V to selected areas of the chip. This helps contain the total current drain to less than 450mA.

Clock requirements are met by connecting an 8 MHz crystal directly to two pins. Alternatively, out of phase signals from an external clock generator can be used.

A second unique feature is a dedicated 13-bit address and 16-bit data bus to access program memory, allowing 8192 16-bit program words to be directly addressed. This allows ROM / PROM program memories to be directly connected without further hardware. A second combined 8-bit address/data bus, the Interface Vector (IV) bus, is used for data and I/O. Two control signals, WC (write command) and SC (select command), determine the state of the IV bus as follows:

- SC=1, WC=0: I/O address is being output on the IV bus
- SC=0, WC=1: I/O data is being output on the IV bus
- SC=0, WC=0: I/O input data is being expected on the IV bus

A further two signals, LB (left bank select) and RB (right bank select), effectively double the IV bus address space and were most often used to switch between RAM memory in one bank and I/O ports in the other.

Another unusual feature is that rather than execute mask, rotate, shift and merge instructions in the arithmetic logic unit (ALU), as is the case with most microprocessors, the 8X300 has separate mask, rotate, shift and merge units. Data can therefore be rotated, masked, modified, shifted and merged (in that order), all in one instruction cycle.

=== Instruction set ===
8X300 registers
^{1}_{2}	^{1}_{1}	^{1}_{0}	^{0}_{9}	^{0}_{8}	^{0}_{7}	^{0}_{6}	^{0}_{5}	^{0}_{4}	^{0}_{3}	^{0}_{2}	^{0}_{1}	^{0}_{0}	(bit position)
Main registers
					AUX								Implied arg
					R1
					R2
					R3
					R4
					R5
					R6
					R9
					OVF							C	Carry
Program Counter
PC

The processor normally manipulates 8-bit data bytes, but the mask unit makes it possible to manipulate single or multiple bits, making this a variable data-length processor. Internal data is stored in 8-bit read/write registers—R1 through R6, R9, and an auxiliary register (R0 or AUX). The auxiliary register holds one of the operands used in two-operand instructions, such as ADD or AND, and a single-bit (read only) overflow register (R8 or OVF) stores the carry-over bit from ADD operations. Two virtual write only registers IVL (R7) and IVR (R15) are used to put an address on the IV bus, and two sets of eight virtual registers (R16-R23 and R24-R31) are used to transfer data to or from the IV bus. In the latter case, the upper two bits of the register number select the left or right bank, and the lower three bits define the number of places the data is to be rotated or shifted. An 8-bit IV-bus buffer retains a copy of the last data to be transferred to or from the IV bus. This data is used in merge operations. Note that this article uses decimal numbering for the registers; Signetics documentation uses octal.

The three most significant bits of the instruction define the opcode, and divide the instructions into eight classes:

- The MOVE instruction allows the contents of selected registers to be copied, placed on the IV bus, read from the IV bus, or transferred IV bus to IV bus.
- The ADD, AND and XOR classes are similar, except that with these instructions the contents of the auxiliary register are combined with the source register before the MOVE part of the instruction is executed.
- The XEC instruction allows a selected instruction at a different local address and offset to be executed without incrementing the program counter.
- The NZT instruction allows a conditional branch to be implemented.
- The XMIT instruction allows an 8-bit binary pattern specified in the instruction to be placed in a specified register or on the IV bus. It is similar to a load-immediate instruction.
- The JMP instruction performs an unconditional branch to anywhere within the 8192 word program memory.

The use of the remaining 13 bits of the instruction depends on the opcode:

- MOVE, AND, ADD and XOR instructions: 5 bits are used to define the source register, 3 bits are used to define any rotate or mask operation (the R/L field), and the remaining 5 bits define the destination register.
- XEC and NZT: 5 bits are used to define the source register, the remaining 8 bits define the address field.
  - XEC: the contents of the source register are first added to the address field, which is then used as the lower 8 bits of the program address.
  - NZT: the jump is taken if the source register is non-zero. If the jump is taken, the address field is used as the lower 8 bits of the program address.
- XMIT: 5 bits are used to define the destination register, the remaining 8 bits define the data.
- JMP: all 13 bits are used as an absolute address in program memory.

=== Shift, rotate, mask and merge ===
The rotate and mask units are located between the register bank and the ALU. Therefore, all data can, in principle, be rotated and masked before it enters the ALU.

- Rotate Unit: This unit will Rotate the data to the RIGHT by the number of places specified in the opcode.
- Mask Unit: This unit will mask off (set to zero) the upper bits of the data so as to retain the number of lower bits specified in the opcode.

The Shift and Merge units are located between the ALU and the IV bus, and any data sent to IV bus can therefore be shifted and merged before being output.

- Shift Unit: This unit will shift the data to the LEFT the number of places specified in the opcode.
- Merge Unit: This unit will Merge (replace) the number of bits specified by the opcode in the IV-bus buffer with the data before placing the contents of the buffer on the IV bus.

Note: a count of zero for the number of bits to merge will result in all 8 bits being replaced.

The following combinations are possible, depending on the source and destination:

- MOVE, ADD, AND and XOR instructions:
  - register to register (including IVL and IVR registers): Rotate
  - register to IV bus (data output): shift and merge
  - IV-bus input to register: rotate and mask
  - IV-bus input to IV-bus output: rotate, mask, shift and merge
  - IV-bus input to IVL or IVR register (IV-bus address output): rotate and mask
- XEC and NZT:
  - IV-bus input: rotate and mask
- XMIT
  - IV-bus data output: shift and merge

=== I/O ===
Transferring data to and from the 8X300 is a two-step process:

- Step 1: Using one of the MOVE, ADD, AND, XOR or XMT instructions and specifying one of the virtual registers IVL (left bank) or IVR (right bank) as the destination, an address is output on the IV bus, along with Select Command and Bank Select signals. This may have to be repeated if both banks are used.

Because the I/O address is output separately, the I/O ports must hold (latch) the selection. This can be done with separate address decoders and latches, or with an I/O port with integrated address decoding and latching, such as the 8X32. Because of the latching, I/O ports, once addressed, remain active until a different address is output, and can be accessed multiple times without the need to address them again. Two I/O ports (or RAM addresses) can be active at the same time, using the Bank Select signals to rapidly switch between them without further addressing.

- Step 2: Data is transferred to or from the 8X300 using any of the instructions except JMP and specifying one of the registers R16–R31 as the source and/or destination. The register chosen defines which Bank Select signal accompanies the transfer.

Faster I/O selection may be implemented by adding bits to the instruction word to select one or two IV devices with each instruction. Instead of sending an explicit address to a device on the bus, the wider instruction word is centrally latched and used as device selects on an instruction-by-instruction basis.

=== Interrupts ===
The 8X300 has no built-in interrupt capability. Signetics has published extensive application notes describing how interrupts can be retrofitted to the 8X300. The interrupt latency is less than 750 nanoseconds. Interrupts consist of a number steps, each requiring hardware assistance:

- Save the current Program Counter contents. The PC can be latched from the 13-bit address bus on any instruction except XEC. For this reason, interrupts must be ignored during XEC.
- Retain the last used IVL and IVR addresses. Signetics suggests capturing these address writes with a shadow RAM. Note: the 8X305 does not need shadow RAM as it has built-in IVL and IVR address memory.
- Make the program jump to a fixed interrupt service address. External hardware must take over the 16-bit instruction bus and jam a JMP instruction.
- At the end of the interrupt service routine, restore the IVL and IVR addresses from RAM (8X300) or from the address register memory (8X305).
- Detect an ad-hoc return instruction. Signetics suggests a JMP 17777, all ones. Signetics hints that only the 13 address bits (but no opcode) need to be decoded.
- Restore the original contents of the Program Counter. Again, external hardware must take over the 16-bit instruction bus and jam a JMP opcode with the address latched earlier from the program address bus.

== 8X305 ==
In 1982, Signetics released an improved and faster version, the 8X305. This processor went on to become very popular in military applications and was second-sourced by Advanced Micro Devices as the AM29X305. Eventually, production rights were sold to Lansdale Semiconductor Inc., who was still offering the 8X305 as of 2025.

The 8X305 offers two main improvements over the 8X300:

- Minimum instruction cycle time was reduced from 250 ns to 200 ns, allowing the 8X305 to execute 5 million instructions per second.
- Seven new registers were added. Three of these registers, R13, R14, and R15 operate exactly the same as R1-R6. Two other new general registers, R10 and R11, operate as normal registers on all instructions except XMIT. If XMIT is issued, the data is sent to the IV bus but R10 and R11 remain unchanged. R7 and R15 are the IV address selection registers. Unlike the 8X300, they now remember the address that was written to them. This can be particularly useful if the 8X305 is interrupted as the selected IV address is part of the architectural state and must be restored after an interrupt.

== Applications ==
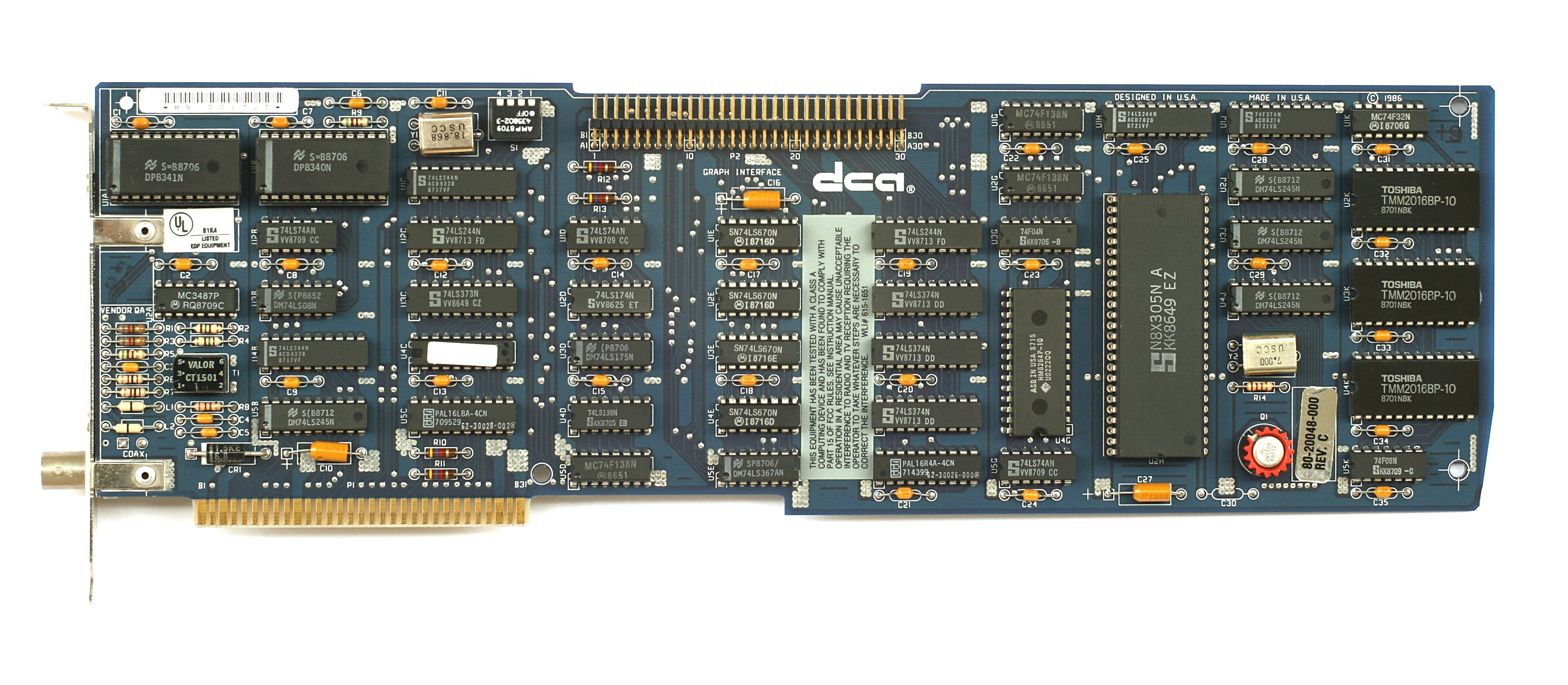
8X305 used in an IRMA interface card to support IBM 3270 terminal emulation

In an extensive application note, Signetics showed how to use the 8X300 as a floppy disk controller. A revised application note showed the use of the 8X300 together with the 8X330. Other application notes described:

- A teletype multiplexer
- A data concentrator
- A remote terminal controller
- A computer I/O bus emulator
- Interfacing RAM memory

A demonstration system (contained in a briefcase) and application note showed the 8X300 being used in a traffic-light controller.

Olivetti used the 8X300 and later 8X305 as the controller for the ST506 hard disk in the M20 personal computer series.

Convergent Technologies used the 8X300, 8X320, and 8X330 in their AWS hard disk controller in 1981.

Western Digital used the 8X300 in their WD1000 ST506 hard disk controller and the 8X305 in their WD1001 ECC hard disk controller. WD1000/WD1001 were used as reference designs for the Olivetti M20, TRS-80, and Kaypro 10.

== Support devices ==
- 8X01: Cyclic redundancy checker
- 8X31 / 8T31: 8-bit latched bidirectional I/O port
- 8X32 / 8X36 / 8X42: 8-bit latched addressable bidirectional I/O port
- 8T39: Addressable bus expander
- 8X41: Asynchronous bidirectional bus extender and repeater (SABER)
- 8T58: Transparent bus expander
- 8X320: Bus interface register array
- 8X330: Floppy disk formatter/controller
- 8X350: 2048-bit bipolar RAM (256*8) 35 ns access time
- SMS360 / 8X360: Interface vector byte
Chip and die photos

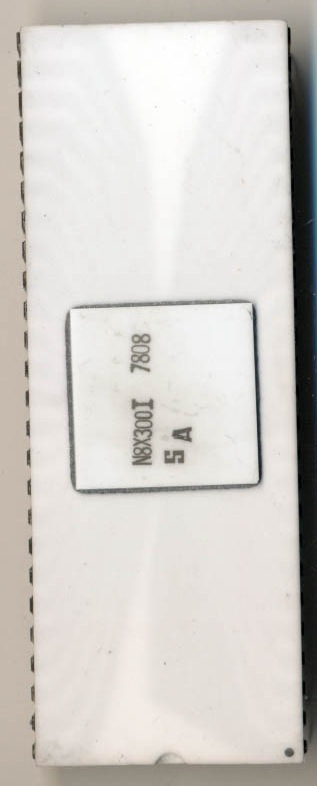
Signetics N8X300I - Early 1978

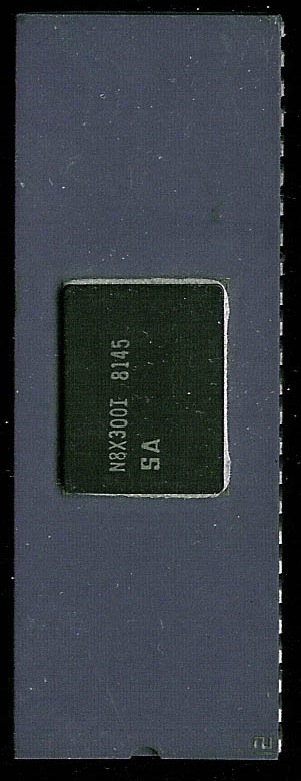
Signetics N8X300I - 1981

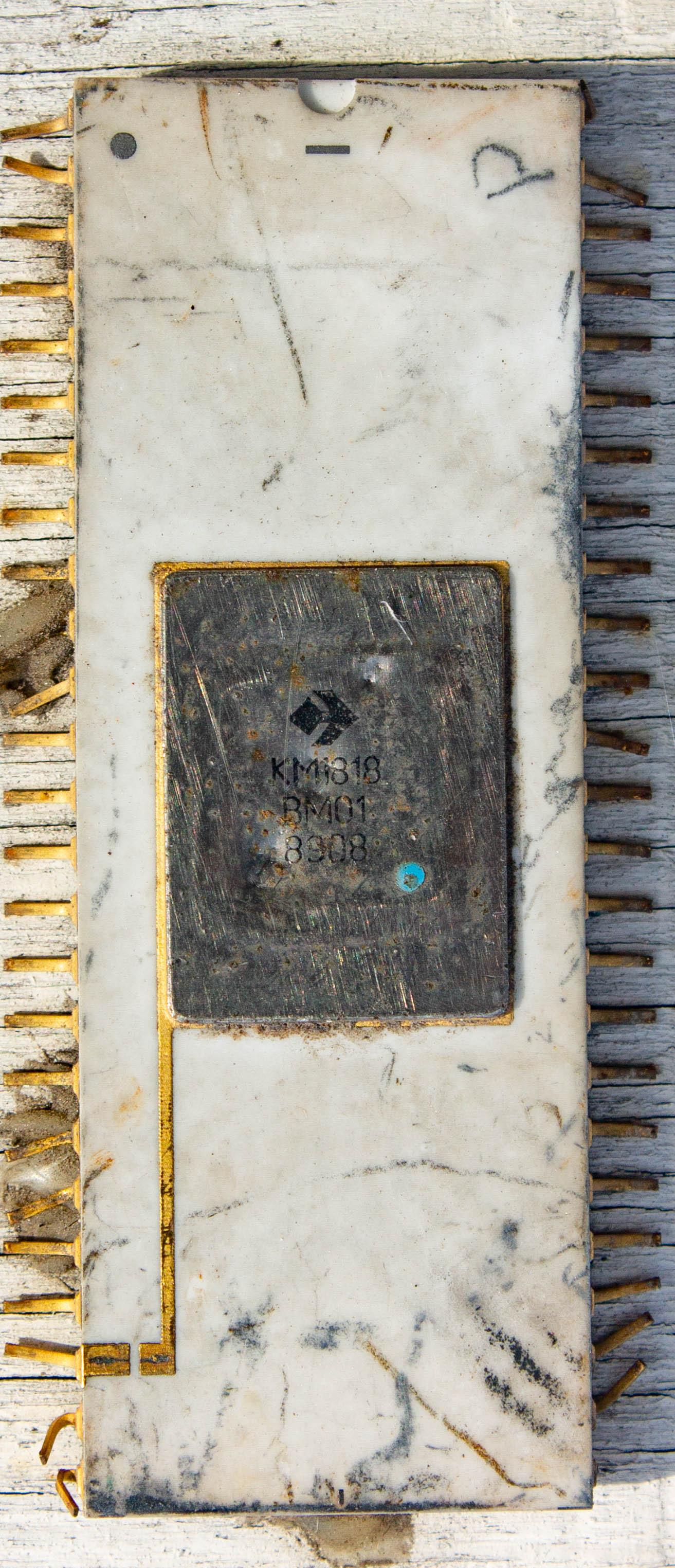
Russian clone KM1818VM01

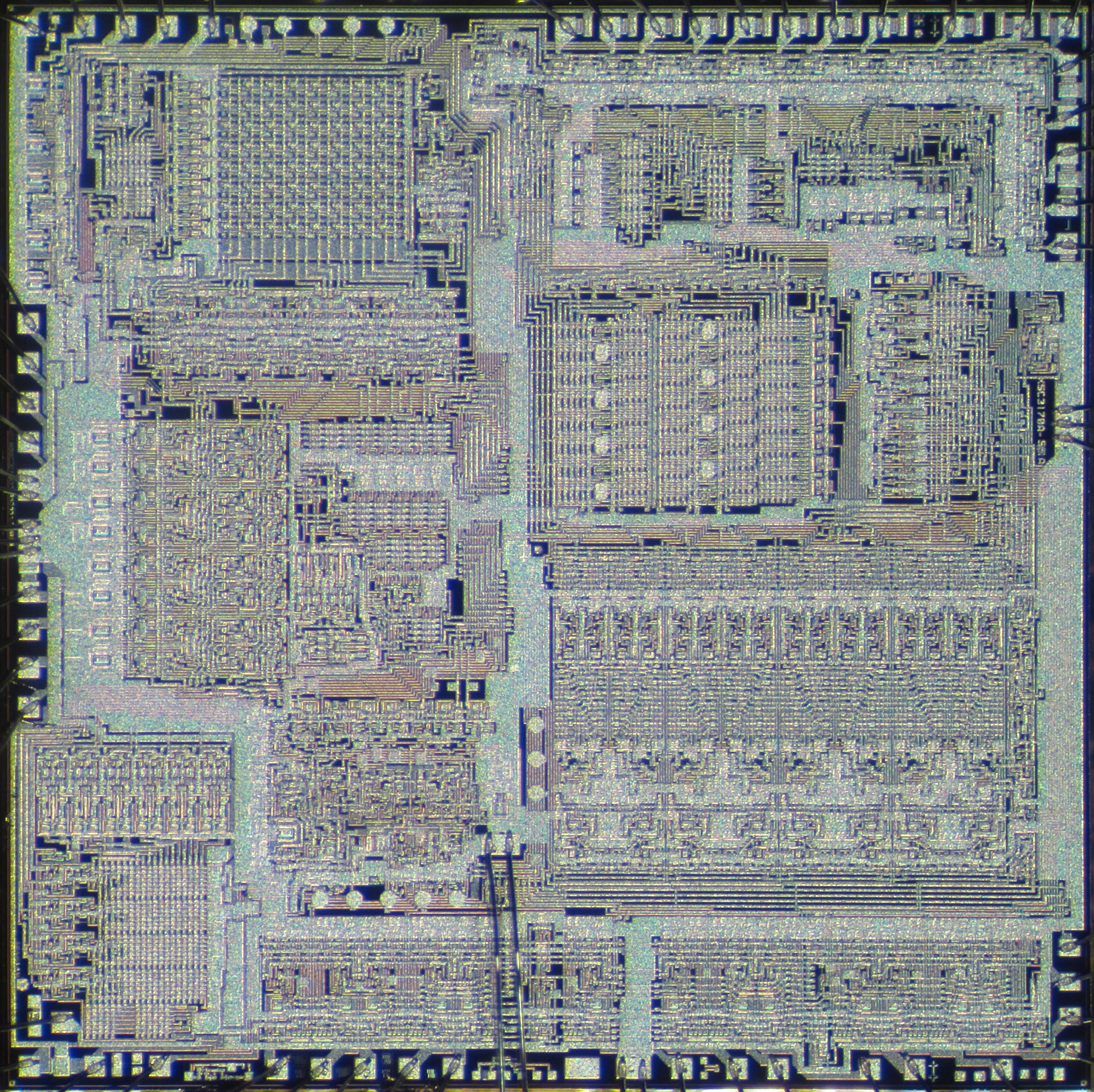
Die of Signetics 8X300

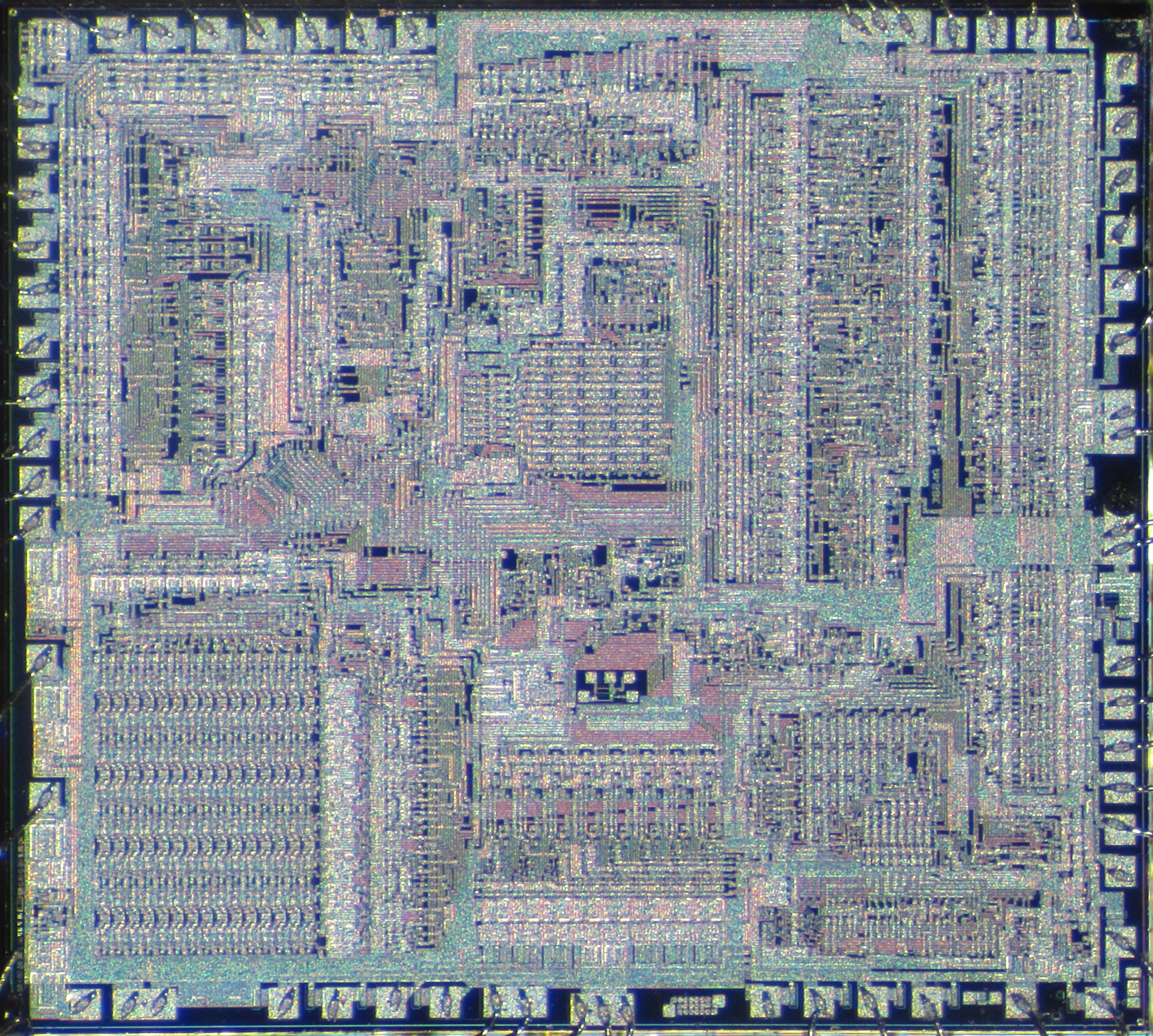
Die of Signetics 8X305
