= Signetics =

1961–1975 American integrated circuits manufacturer

Signetics Corporation
- Logo used from 1971 to 1981
- Industry: Integrated circuits
- Founded: 1961
- Founder: David Allison, David James, Lionel Kattner, and Mark Weissenstern
- Fate: Acquired by Philips
- Headquarters: Sunnyvale, California, USA

Signetics Corporation was an American electronics manufacturer specifically established in Silicon Valley to make integrated circuits. Founded in 1961, they went on to develop a number of early microprocessors and support chips, as well as the widely used 555 timer chip. The company was bought by Philips in 1975 and incorporated in Philips Semiconductors (now NXP).

== History ==
Logo used from the 1960s to 1971

The formation of Signetics at 680 West Maude Avenue in Sunnyvale, California was announced on October 16, 1961 by a group of engineers formerly with Fairchild Semiconductor.

Signetics founders
Name	Position	at Fairchild
Dr. B. David James	President	head of Physics Dept
David F. Allison	Vice-President	head of Device Development Dept
Lionel E. Kattner	Vice-President	technical staff
Mark Weissenstern	Vice-President	technical staff

Board of Directors
Warren Hellman	Lehman Brothers
Theodore Petterson	former president of Standard Oil of California
David James
Lionel Kattner
Whit Budge	attorney

At the time, Fairchild was concentrating on its discrete component business (mostly transistors), and its management felt that by making integrated circuits (ICs) it would lose its customers. Signetics founders believed that ICs were the future of electronics (much like another contemporary Fairchild spinoff, Amelco) and wished to commercialize them. The name of the new company was coined from Signal Network Electronics.

Lionel Kattner in 2007 recollected that "Sig" and "netics" as common word fragments in the industry had just popped into his head.

The venture was financed by a group organized through Lehman Brothers, who invested $1M. The initial idea was to design and manufacture ICs for specific customers. In order to facilitate this goal, Signetics did not have a separate R&D lab; instead, the engineering was all done in technical development department, and was closely tied to marketing.

Signetics first developed a small number of standard DTL ICs, which it announced in 1962.

Early Signetics DTL ICs,
Name	Die	Description	Pins	Transistors	Diodes (Note: Diodes were not separately manufactured. There were 2 kinds of diodes: VFD1 consisting of the base-collector and VFD2 of the base-emitter junction of the standard VFT1 transistor)	Resistors	Capacitors
SE101	VF101	4-input NAND (Note: called NAND/NOR gate by Signetics. The exact same circuit functions as NAND in positive logic (Vcc is logic 1) and NOR in negative logic (Vcc is logic 0).)	10	1	6	3	0
SE102	VF101	3-input NAND (Note: Presumably a partially defective die)	9				
SE104	? (Note: presumably a VF101 die)	6 diodes array	8	0	6	1	0
SE120	VF120	flip-flop	7	2	10	8	2
SE121	VF120	?					
SE122	VF120	?					
SE130	?	buffer	5	5	5	6	0
SE140	VF140	2-input XOR	8	1	7	3	0
TTL
SE200	?	3-input TTL NAND	7	2 (Note: One standard and one multi-emitter transistor)	0	2	0

Revenue (bold = official)
Year	Revenue	Headcount
1963	$1,892,000	307
1964	$4,942,000	309
1965	$5,803,000	646
1966	$12,635,000	1,224
1967	$20,932,000	1,928
1968	$29,054,000	2,745
**1969**	$41,357,000	4,052
**1970**	$33,726,000	2,322
**1971**	$31,840,000	3,698
**1972**	$48,428,000	5,194
**1973**	$98,274,000	9,557
1974	$120,836,000	6,688
1975	$77,600,000	6,400
1976	$127,400,000	8,635
1977	$172,300,000	8,042
1978	$201,275,000	9,793
1979	$257,645,000	11,742
1980	$367,805,000	13,888

The standard dies (VF101, VF120, VF140) were the basis for the variFEBS (Note: FEB: Functional Electronic Block, a term for integrated circuit (that did not stick).) customization option, where the interconnect (metallization) layer was specified by the customer. Texas Instruments offered a similar service with their Master Slice product. The preFEBS option on the other hand allowed customers to send in full-custom designs prototyped on breadboards with Signetics-approved discrete components. Fairchild offered a similar service with their Integrated Circuit Breadboards product. Everything above except the SE200 TTL was advertised for in January 1963 and perhaps a little earlier.

However, it was struggling to sell custom-made circuits, which was the original goal, and was quickly exhausting the initial investment money, so new investors had to be found. In November 1962, Corning Glass Works invested another $1.7M in Signetics, in exchange for 51% ownership. This money enabled Signetics to survive, and much of the funding was put into a marketing and sales campaign.

In 1963, the Department of Defense made a decision to begin a shift towards microelectronics and ICs, due to their small size, higher reliability, and lower power consumption. As a result, military contractors began to explore the field, and as Signetics was one of the few firms selling custom circuits, it benefited greatly. In the fall of 1963 and throughout most of 1964, sales grew quickly, and the company finally became profitable. Signetics also grew rapidly, hiring more engineers and increasing its manufacturing space. In 1964, Signetics opened a large new fabricating plant ("fab") in Sunnyvale, California. At this time, it was by far the largest manufacturer of ICs in Silicon Valley. It later expanded also to factories in Orem, Utah and Albuquerque, New Mexico, where there were two fabs, FAB22 (4-inch) and FAB23 (6-inch).

President James F. Riley announced on June 8, 1966 that Signetics would establish a plant in Provo, Utah at 1450 North State Street in a 30,000sqft former bowling alley, with production to begin in September 1966. A payroll of $1 million per year was to support a work force of 150. The plant closed on December 15, 1992, final employment was 900, down from a prior all-time high of 2000. Operations were moved to Albuquerque, Sunnyvale and Caen. Plant additions in 1974, 1981 and 1988 had increased the square footage to an eventual 530,000.

In 1964, Fairchild began to muscle its way into the IC business. Since Signetics circuits were the de facto standard in the market, Fairchild decided to copy them. However, it used its superior cash position, marketing power, and manufacturing strength to undercut its competitor by slashing prices and flooding the market. Signetics was struggling to compete, and began losing money again. Corning saw this as proof of poor management, and used its controlling interest to drive out most of the founders and take complete control of the company.

Chips sold in 1966

DTL ICs (Sep 12, 1966)
Name	Description	Price 1-24pcs				
Name	Description	SE1xxK	SE1xxG	SE1xxJ	NE1xxJ	NE1xxA
Name	Description	-55-125 °C			0-70 °C	
Name	Description	TO-5	flat pack			DIP
Name	Description	10-lead		14-lead		
101	4-input NAND	15.00	16.80			
102	3-input NAND	14.70	16.55			
105	6-input gate expander	10.50	12.40			
106	dual 5-input gate expander			7.30	5.10	4.50
110	3-input high fanout NAND	16.55	18.60			
111	dual 4-input high fanout NAND			15.50		
112	dual 3-input high fanout NAND			15.50	6.85	
113	dual 3-input high fanout NAND	16.55				
115	dual 2-input NAND	16.55	18.60			
116	dual 4-input NAND			13.35	6.55	5.90
124	RST flip-flop	20.20	22.40	17.85	10.40	6.85
125	J-K flip-flop			19.80	11.55	8.45
150	2-input clock/capacitive line driver	17.20	19.15			
155	dual 4-input clock/capacitive line driver			15.50		
156	dual 4-input clock/capacitive line driver			15.50	7.65	6.85
157	dual 3-input clock/capacitive line driver	17.20				
160	one-shot multivibrator	57.50	59.90			
161	one-shot multivibrator	72.00		59.90	26.10	
170	triple 3-input NAND			14.80	7.45	5.90
180	quad 2-input NAND			14.80	7.45	5.90
181	quad inverter	20.20				
		CS7xxK	CS7xxG	CS7xxJ		
700	dual 3-2-input NAND	17.20	19.15			
701	dual 3-2-input NAND	17.20	19.15			
704	RST flip-flop	21.00	23.20			
705	dual 3-input AND	13.00	15.00			
709	dual 3-input gate expander	8.30	10.50			
715	dual 2-input clock/capacitive line driver	20.00				
716	dual 2-input high fanout NAND	19.50				
720	quad 2-input NAND			15.60		
721	triple 3-input NAND			15.60		
727	triple 2-input NAND			15.60		
729	RST flip-flop			18.60		
730	dual 5-input NAND			14.10		
731	quad 2-input gate expander			8.00		
732	12-input gate expander			8.00		

UTILOGIC (low cost) 10-lead ICs (Sep 12, 1966)
Name	Description	Price 1-24pcs		
Name	Description	SU3xxK	SU3xxG	LU3xxK
Name	Description	-20-85 °C		10-55 °C
Name	Description	TO-5	flat pack	TO-5
300	dual 3-input gate expander	7.35	10.15	3.90
305	6-input AND	8.20	11.00	4.20
306	dual 3-input AND	8.20	11.00	4.20
314	7-input NOR	8.20	11.00	4.20
315	dual 3-input NOR	8.20	11.00	4.20
316	dual 2-input NOR	8.20	11.00	4.20
320	J-K flip-flop	13.30	16.10	5.55
331	dual 2-input OR	8.20	11.00	4.20
332	dual 3-input OR	8.20	11.00	4.20

Low Power ICs (Sep 12, 1966)
Name	Description	Price 1-24 pcs				
Name	Description	SE4xxJ	NE4xxJ	NE4xxA	SP4xxA	ST4xxA
Name	Description	-55-125 °C	0-70 °C	0-70 °C	15-55 °C	0-70 °C
Name	Description	flat pack		DIP		
416	dual 4-input NAND	22.50	11.25	6.60	5.25	5.75
417	dual 3-input NAND	22.50	11.25	6.60	5.25	5.75
424	dual flip-flop	30.00	15.00	12.00	10.00	11.00
440	dual XOR	23.20	12.00	6.60	5.25	5.75
455	dual 4-input buffer	23.20	12.00	6.60	5.25	5.75
480	quad 2-input NAND	23.20	12.00	6.60	5.25	5.75

Linear ICs (Sep 12, 1966)
Name	Description	Prices 1-24pcs		
Name	Description	SE5xxK	SE5xxG	NE5xxK
Name	Description	-55-125 °C		0-70 °C
Name	Description	TO-5	flat pack	TO-5
500	gated sense amplifier	22.50	25.50	11.25
501	video amplifier	34.40	37.40	17.15
504	gated sense amplifier	22.50	25.50	11.25
505	general purpose differential amplifier	22.50	25.50	11.25
506	differential operational amplifer	52.50	54.50	26.25
518	analog comparator	22.50	25.50	11.25

TTL ICs (Sep 12, 1966)
Name	Description	Prices 1-24pcs				
Name	Description	SE8xxJ	NE8xxJ	SP8xxA	ST8xxA	NE8xxA
Name	Description	-55-125 °C	0-70 °C	15-55 °C	0-70 °C	
Name	Description	flat pack		DIP		
806	dual 4-input gate expander	10.40	5.20	4.65	4.88	5.25
807	8-input NAND	13.35	6.55	4.65	5.10	5.75
816	dual 4-input NAND	13.35	6.55	4.65	5.10	5.75
825	J-K flip-flop	19.80	11.55	7.20	7.90	9.00
826	dual AC flip-flop	30.00	15.00	12.60	13.80	15.00
840	dual XOR	14.20	7.10	5.25	5.75	6.60
855	dual 4-input power gate	15.50	7.65	5.25	5.75	6.60
870	triple 3-input NAND	14.80	7.45	5.25	5.75	6.60

Signetics managed to stabilize and become profitable again, but it never regained its market leadership, which was now firmly held by Fairchild. Its engineers continued to innovate in IC technology, and remained a significant force. Around 1971, the Signetics introduced the innovative 555 timer IC, which it called "The IC Time Machine". This was the first and only low-cost commercial IC timer available at the time, and soon became a best-seller. Signetics was known for creating innovative ICs for both analog electronics and the rapidly-growing digital electronics applications.

In November 1973, Signetics raised $20,600,000 with the sale of 1,300,000 shares of common stock to the public. This diluted Corning's stake from 92% to 70.2%. The first annual report to shareholders was published for the year ending December 30, 1973.

In 1975 second source production began of 2 chips of the Intel 3000 series bit slice microprocessor.

Logo used from 1981 until its closure

In 1975, the company was acquired by Philips, who continued the brand for some years. In the United States, Signetics reached its manufacturing height at around 1980. Later it was fully integrated into Philips Semiconductors (now NXP).

In 1995, Philips spun off the assembly and test operation in South Korea, which was started by Signetics in 1966, as an independent subcontract service provider. They continue to use the name "Signetics". Since 2000, the Signetics brand is primarily used by the Young Poong Group.

== Notable devices ==
Signetics introduced a number of innovative analog and digital integrated circuits which became de facto standard products widely used in mass-produced electronics. Freely-distributed application notes published by Signetics were key in educating students and practicing engineers in the usefulness and simplicity of their ICs. Some designs remain iconic and are still used today in basic electronics lab exercises.

- The Signetics 555 timer IC was probably their best-known new product. Still widely manufactured and used today in original and updated versions, the basic design appears in many simple electronic timers, oscillators, and other basic electronic systems.
- The Signetics NE565 was a pioneering implementation of powerful phase-locked loop technology in an IC, which along with the voltage-controlled oscillator (VCO) NE566, helped advance digital communications.
- The Signetics 2650 was an 8-bit microprocessor introduced in the early 1970s and used in several video games and game systems (e.g. the Arcadia 2001). and in the early telesoftware broadcasts.
- The Signetics 8X300 was a bipolar microprocessor developed by Scientific Micro Systems but manufactured by Signetics starting in 1976. It was mostly used as a controller chip due to its limited instruction set and its high speed.
- The Signetics 2513 was a character generator chip used in the TV Typewriter, Apple I, and early versions of the Apple II, as well as Atari's earliest arcade games.
- The Signetics 82S100 FPLA (Field Programmable Logic Array) was the first commercially successful user programmable logic device, the forerunner of the modern FPGA.
- NE5532, a widely used audio op amp, now generic and produced by many other manufacturers. According to one 1993 article, NE5532 was "the standard audio op amp to which others are compared".
- NE5517, an operational transconductance amplifier, still in production by NXP Semiconductors and also generically made by other manufacturers; it is given as a classic OTA example in a number of textbooks.

== See also ==
- Write-only memory (joke)
