= Elektor TV Games Computer =

Programmable computer system by Elektor

- Manufacturer: Elektor
- Released: April 1979
- CPU: Signetics 2650
- Storage: Cassette
- Graphics: Signetics 2636
- Sound: Signetics 2636

The Elektor TV Games Computer (TVGC) was a programmable computer system sold by Elektor in kit form from April 1979. It used the Signetics 2650 CPU with the Signetics 2636 PVI for graphics and sound. These were the same chips as used in the Interton VC 4000 console family. A 2K monitor ROM written by Philips and a cassette interface were the most important differences between the TVGC and the Interton family. Many VC 4000 games were adapted versions of TV Games Computer games, most games were basic due to the TVGC's limited capabilities. It is possible to add cartridge slots to the TVGC to enable it to play console games, and the Hobby Module of the Acetronic console effectively transforms it into a basic TVGC.

The RAM and sound capabilities of the computer can be expanded. A pair of General Instruments AY-3-8910 Programmable Sound Generators are used in the expanded version, meaning that this machine had the most powerful sound capabilities of the time. A noise generator, random number generators and cartridge ports are among the other expansions described. Hardware and software were available from Elektor and Locosoft.

The October 2008 issue of Elektor magazine features the TVGC in its "Retronics" section.
