= Douglas Self =

British electronics engineer and author

- Education: Cambridge University
- Known for: Author, Electronic Engineer

Douglas Self is a British electronics engineer and author with a particular interest in audio. He received a first class honours degree in engineering from Cambridge University, and then studied psychoacoustics at Sussex University. He is the author of six books on audio electronics, published by Focal Press. He has also contributed many articles to Wireless World magazine, some of which were compiled into a book along with articles by Peter Baxandall.

He is a member of the Audio Engineering Society and has taken out a number of audio-related patents, including for a "crossover displacement circuit".

He has worked with several major companies, including Cambridge Audio, TAG-McLaren Audio, and Soundcraft Electronics. Circuit Cellar website described him as a 'renowned audio specialist' when discussing a design he created for Elektor magazine. He developed the concept, accompanied with a practical design, of a "blameless" amplifier in which all the main sources of distortion for a pure Class B amplifier are reduced to negligible levels, to challenge the notion that such a topology is not suitable for Hi-Fi audio.

Self's books have been well received. His Audio Power Amplifier Design Handbook was recommended by Walt Jung and described as "famous" by audio website hifisonix. The second edition of his Small Signal Audio Design received a very positive review in Sound on Sound magazine.

== Publications ==
- Audio Engineering Explained (2009); Focal Press; ISBN 9780240812731
- Baxandall and Self on Audio Power (2011); Linear Audio; ISBN 9789490929039
- Audio Power Amplifier Design 6th edition (2013); Focal Press; ISBN 9780240526133
- Self on Audio: The Collected Audio Design Articles of Douglas Self (2015); Focal Press; ISBN 9781138854468
- Electronics for Vinyl (2017); Routledge; ISBN 9781138705456
- The Design of Active Crossovers 2nd edition (2018); Routledge; ISBN 9781138733039
- Small Signal Audio Design 3rd edition (2020); Routledge; ISBN 9780367468958

== See also ==
- Audio power amplifier
