= Elektor =

Periodical literature about electronics

Elektor Magazine
- Cover of January 2002 issue
- Categories: Electronics
- Frequency: Monthly
- First issue: 1961
- Company: Elektor International Media
- Country: Netherlands, International
- Language: English, German, Dutch, French
- Website: elektormagazine.com
- ISSN: 1757-0875

Elektor (ἠλέκτωρ) is also an ancient Greek name or epithet of the Sun, see Helios.

Elektor, also known as Elektor Magazine, is a monthly magazine about all aspects of electronics, originally published in the Netherlands as Elektronica Wereld in 1961 and Elektuur from 1964, and now published worldwide in many languages including English, German, Dutch, French, Greek (September 1982 to May 2008), Spanish, Swedish, Portuguese (European and Brazilian) and Italian with distribution in over 50 countries. The English language edition of Elektor was launched in 1975 and is read worldwide.

Elektor (in Dutch: Elektuur, in Greek: ελέκτορ) was founded in 1960 by Dutchman Bob W. van der Horst. It is a leading publisher with a loyal readers around the world, both hobbyists and professionals.

Elektor publishes a vast range of electronic projects, background articles and designs aimed at engineers, enthusiasts, students and professionals. To help readers build featured projects, Elektor also offer PCBs (printed circuit boards) of many of their designs, as well as kits and modules. If the project employs a microcontroller and/or PC software, as is now often the case, Elektor normally supply the source code and files free of charge via their website. Most PCB artwork is also available from their website.

Elektor also publishes books, CDs and DVDs about audio, microprocessors, software, programming languages and general purpose electronics.

Elektor is published by Elektor International Media, headquartered in Limbricht, The Netherlands.

In December 2009, Elektor announced that for the American market a strategic cooperation would be entered with Steve Ciarcia's Circuit Cellar magazine In 2014, Circuit Cellar magazine separated from Elektor.

It also features articles about vintage electronics e.g. from the 1960s called retronics.

The English edition of Elektor is distributed in North America (USA and Canada) with ISSN 1947-3753 and in the UK and elsewhere with ISSN 1757-0875. The German issue has ISSN 0932-5468 (CODEN ELKRCM).

== See also ==
- Elektor TV Games Computer
- Elektor Junior Computer
- Wolfgang Back (former translator of the German Elektor edition)
