= Mitch Swenson =

American writer

Mitch Swenson is an American author, war reporter, screenwriter, and game designer.

== Journalism ==
Swenson started reporting in 2011 while studying journalism at the American University in Cairo.

In 2013, Swenson, David Axe, and another journalist, snuck into northern Syria through Reyhanlı, Turkey to report on the Syrian Civil War. Afterward, Swenson called the conflict an, "all-consuming, merciless and heart-eating machine of war."

In 2014, he graduated from Columbia University with a major in Creative Nonfiction.

In 2016, Swenson reported on the ancient Russian martial art of Systema for The New York Times.

== 1,000 Days of Syria ==
In 2014, Swenson created 1000 Days of Syria, an electronic literature newsgame based on his journalism work in Syria and the rest of the Levant. He said he was inspired to make the game after he found that Syria was some way down on the popular news agenda. "I heard that nine times as many people clicked on links to do with Miley Cyrus than the war," he told The Guardian. "When you consider what would have been more impactful, I think going to war has far greater consequence than a salacious performance by a pop star." In general, the game was received positively by critics and was an official selection at both the 2014 Indie Prize Showcase and the 2014 Meaningful Play Conference.

== Author ==
In 2013, Swenson's true-story novella, The Tracking of a Russian Spy, was published by Thought Catalog as an ebook. Upon release, the work was optioned for film by StudioCanal and The Picture Company. In 2016, Swenson published an extended version of the book, which included other true stories. Logan Lerman is set to play Swenson in the film adaptation of The Tracking of a Russian Spy.

== Bibliography ==
- Mitch Swenson & Paris Ionescu (2012). I Will Probably Sleep Through Your Internet Party. Pas de Terre Press. ISBN 9780615743585
- Mitch Swenson (2016). The Tracking of a Russian Spy & Other True Stories of Sex and Seclusion. Thought Catalog Books. ISBN 9780692687543
- Mitch Swenson & Louis Heilbronn (2017). The Missing: Volumes I-III. Wildebeest Books.
