= Space Trader (Palm OS) =

2002 video game

- Developer: Pieter Spronck
- Platforms: Palm OS, Windows Mobile, Windows, iOS, android
- Release: 2002

Space Trader is a strategy game for Palm OS and Windows Mobile PDAs. It was released in 2002 by Pieter Spronck, a scientist at Tilburg University, and was inspired by David J. Webb's PalmPilot game SolarWars (which in turn was based on Matt Lee's popular Palm game Dope Wars) and the 1980s classic 3D strategy game Elite (though it does not have Elite's 3D flight mode). The game is free software under the GNU General Public License. It has since been ported to various other Platforms by other people as well.

Space Trader for Palm OS centers on buying and selling eleven commodities in various star systems around the galaxy. The player has one of several types of spacecraft, and interacts with other traders, pirates, and police. The creator of the game announced that he was going to create a sequel, called Picoverse, which was announced in late 2002 and expected to be finished in early 2003. As of September 2022, however, no news regarding the game has been released. Despite this Dead Jim Studios released a similar and greatly expanded game for iOS called Dark Nova. Spronck expressed support for the remake on his website.

Space Trader can be played in a Palm OS emulator on archive.org.

== History ==
During the early 1980s, a game called Star Trader, was released for the Commodore 64. Its scope consisted of a small planetary system, the outermost planet of which, "Wolk," was only accessible by the most expensive and most powerful spaceship, attained near the end of the game. The Commodore 64 version served as a rudimentary basis for the Palm OS game.

== Gameplay ==
Space Trader is a complex strategy game where the end goal for players is to acquire enough credits to purchase a moon to retire to. Players initially start in a randomly generated galaxy with a small spaceship, armed with one simple laser, along with 1000 credits. From then, there are several ways to amass the necessary funds to retire and complete the game, with players able to trade goods for profit, bounty hunt or become a pirate.

Trading is the safest and easiest option of the three, along with being the main focus of the game. To trade, players are able to buy and sell ten different commodities in each system, with their prices and quantities dictated by three main factors: a system's technological level, its political system and current events in the system. The player's initial ship will hold only a small amount of cargo for trading, however as the player progress, they are able to purchase larger ships with greater cargo holds, along with buying equipment which allows for additional cargo space.

When traveling across systems, players may encounter various ships, with different interactions depending upon the class of the ship encountered. There are three main different classes: police, traders and pirates. Each class can come in any of the 10 different types of ships. Players may also rarely encounter special items, famous space captains and aliens when traveling to systems. To help protect themselves (or possibly become a pirate), players can purchase different tiers of lasers, along with shields, and even a cloaking device.

Once a player has finally managed to reach the required sum of 500000 credits, the player may make their way to the Utopia system where they can purchase a moon. Once they do this the game ends and players receive a final score.

== Ports ==
Space Trader is available under GNU GPL, so naturally over time various other people ported the game to different platforms. A port for Pocket PC (windows mobile) was the first port of Space Trader created by Jon Welch in 2004.

As of December 2024, there is a modern port to the web that can be played in a web browser.

There are also several modern ports of Space Trader for Android.

- Space Trader for Android - by Russell Wolf claims to be the "faithful reproduction" of original palm OS game with game play and design close to original as possible.Distributed under GPL as well. It is available on F-Droid and Play store.

The Google Play Store lists at least two versions of Space Trader for Android including Russell Wolf's port.

There is a Windows port written in C# by Jay French available on SourceForge.
