= Drug Wars (video game) =

Turn-based strategy computer game created in 1984

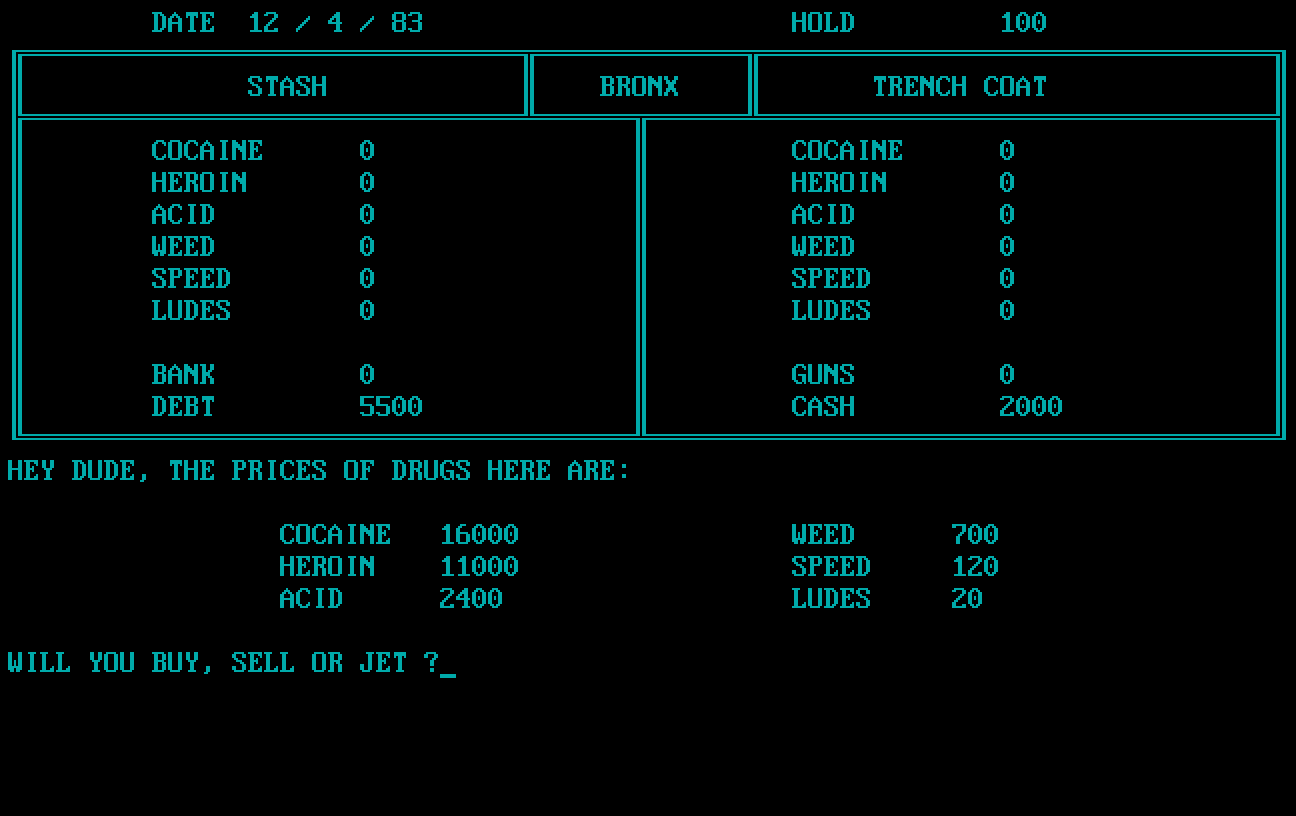
- Developer: John E. Dell
- Publisher: John E. Dell
- Platform: MS-DOS
- Release: 1984
- Genre: Turn-based strategy

Drug Wars is a turn-based strategy video game in which the player assumes the role of a drug dealer engaged in arbitrage. Drug Wars was written for IBM PC compatibles by John E. Dell as a high school project, and released in 1984. The object of the game is to deal the most drugs to pay off the loan shark by the end of the game and make a profit.

Dell later said he had been inspired by a similar trading game that he had played, possibly the 1979 text-based BASIC game Taipan!.

== Gameplay ==
The premise of the game is that the player is a drug dealer living in New York City. The player travels around various neighborhoods such as Manhattan, The Bronx, and Brooklyn. The player also buys and sells various drugs such as Cocaine, Heroin, Acid, Weed, Speed, and Ludes. Traveling from one part of the city to another takes one day. The goal of the game is to make the most money in the given time of 30 days.

The player begins with $2,000, 100 spaces in their trenchcoat, and no weapons. A player must deal with loan sharks who are useful because they provide the much-needed initial capital investment but charge a high interest rate and must be paid back quickly or the player loses the game. During the course of the game, the player can buy a gun or extra pocket space by randomly being offered those things during travel. In each part of the city, the player checks the prices, buys and sells drugs, and then travels to another part of the city.

Other components include the police who are embodied in the character of Officer Hardass. During the game, Hardass and/or one or more of his deputies will randomly confront the player. The player has four choices: to get arrested, to run, to fight, or to keep dealing. Any choice risks injury to the player and after 10 shots the player dies and thus loses the game. In order to fight the police, the player must have a gun; some later versions have the number of deputies increase the odds of being shot (and, in some cases, the odds of hitting an officer) and the player's number of guns affect the odds of hitting an officer. If the player can kill Hardass and his deputies, a cash award will be earned. Random occurrences also occur during the game such as muggings, drug sales, increased drug prices, and the finding of drugs.

After 30 days, the game ends. The final score is calculated by taking the player's current amount of cash in millions and multiplying it by two to obtain a score out of 100. For example, a player who finishes with $25,000,000 will have a final score of 50/100. If a player reaches $50,000,000, the maximum score of 100/100 will be attained and the player will have beaten the game.

== Legacy ==
Over the years a few variations of John E. Dell's original game have been released. Dope Wars for Windows from Beermat Software, an adaptation of the original DOS source code, proved to be one of the most popular versions. Available from 1998 to early 2005 on CNET's download.com, this version was downloaded over 6,500,000 times and was listed in the "50 Most Popular Games" section weekly, for over six years. Beermat Software revived the same game for the Android platform on November 13, 2015, and for iOS on June 27, 2017, available now on Google Play and the Apple App Store, for phones and tablets. Other versions include Dope Wars, a popular version of the game written by Ben Webb. Another popular version is Drug Wars – Underworld, and a fantasy-themed version called Dragon Trader also exists. In 1998, Michael Swain released a modified port of the original TI-82 Drug Wars, for the TI-83 and TI-83 Plus graphing calculators. In 1999, Jason Roberts, Justin Jones, and Dick Beck (JJR Software) released a version for the TI-83 called DrugWars 2: International that added RPG elements, which included fights with cops. In 1995, a TI-BASIC game titled PimpWars was released for the TI-82 that included new features such as the sex trade, drug addiction management, and a simple driving simulation.

A variation on Drug Wars also exists in the Nintendo DS game Grand Theft Auto: Chinatown Wars, where the player can buy 6 different kinds of drugs from various gangs in Liberty City. Price trends are displayed on a map, and the player gets informed of good prices via an in-game email system.

There have been various incarnations of this game. There are web-based versions, cell phone versions, a Windows client, a Linux client, a Palm OS version (Dope Wars), a version for the Newton MessagePad 2100, a version introduced to Pebble smartwatches in 2015, and a version for the Mac OS X Dashboard.

Drug Lord is a similar game from 1991 for DOS, and a PC successor by Fred Bulback, called Drug Lord 2 (2000), also proved popular. The latter game was later ported to Android but was rejected from the Apple App Store.

Also influenced by Drug Wars and Drug Lord, Pimp Wyld was created in 1997 by Otto Bohn. Originally written in BASIC and later converted to C by Anon Bosch, Pimp Wyld took the engine and added extra features such as pimping.

Zynga developed a version of the game for social networking websites such as Myspace. Their version changes some mechanics of the game. Zynga's rendition of Dope Wars took the basic layout of the original game and turned it into an MMORPG-style game with user interaction. The player's objectives are to deal drugs, hire live workers, fight with them for cash in fight club, gamble in the casino, and travel the world while doing missions and building their cartel. Zynga discontinued this game in early December 2009.

== See also ==
- Grand Theft Auto
- NarcoGuerra
- PimpWars
- Star Trader
- Schedule I
