= Video game =

Electronic game with user interface and visual feedback

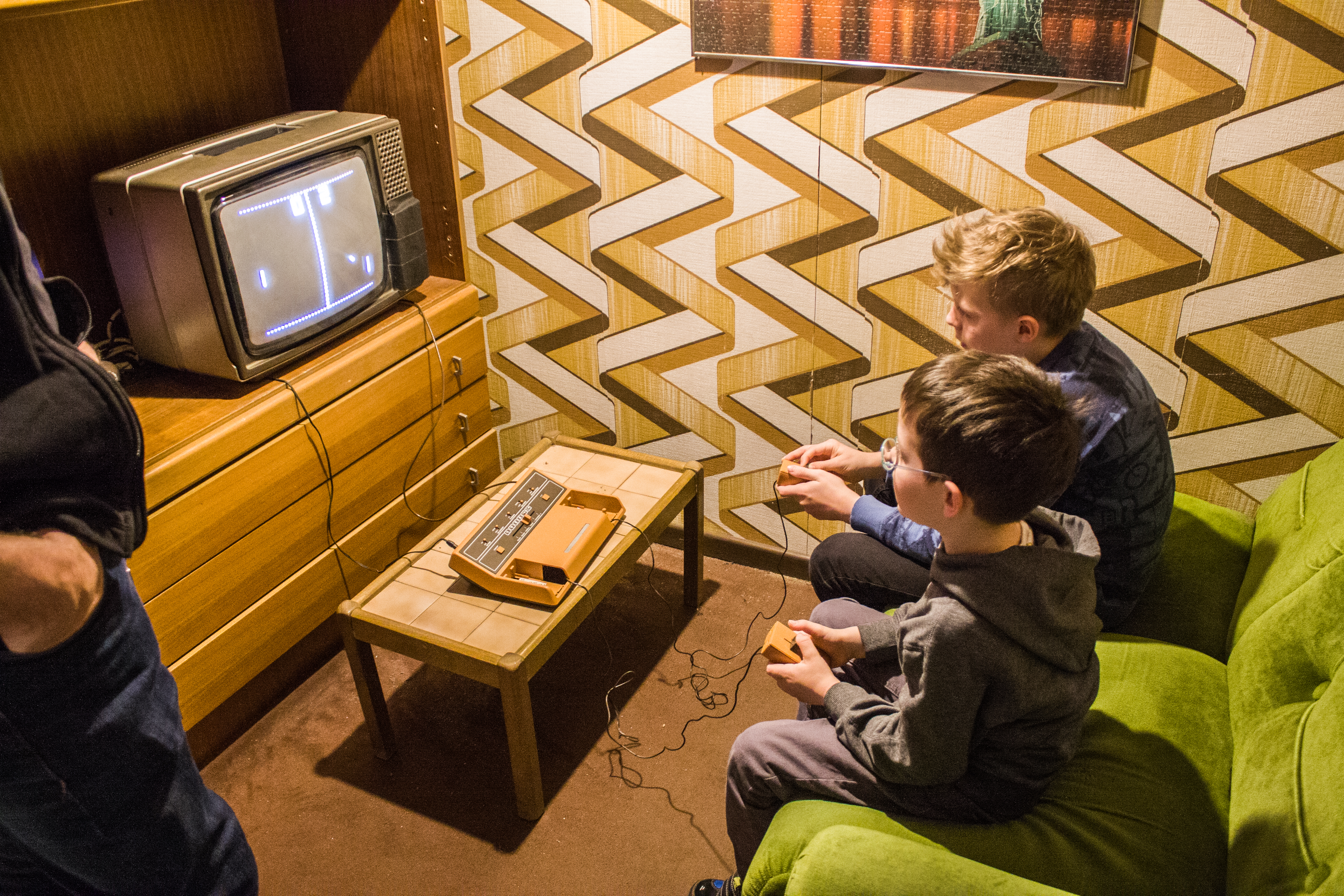
A Pong-clone console of the first generation at the Computerspielemuseum

A video game (Note: "Videogame" may also be used, though this is less frequent.) or computer game, (Note: The term "computer game" to mean "video game" is common in many dialects of English, such as British. In the US, it referred chiefly to PC games. The American distinction is being lost as more console games are being officially released for personal computers, and vice versa.) is an electronic game that involves interaction with a user interface or input device (such as a joystick, controller, keyboard, or motion sensing device) to generate visual feedback from a display device, most commonly shown in a video format on a television set, computer monitor, flat-panel display or touchscreen on handheld devices, or a virtual reality headset. Most modern video games are audiovisual, with audio complement delivered through speakers or headphones, and sometimes also with other types of sensory feedback (e.g., haptic technology that provides tactile sensations). Some video games also allow microphone and webcam inputs for in-game chatting and livestreaming.

Video games are typically categorized according to their hardware platform, which traditionally includes arcade video games, console games, and computer games (which includes LAN games, online games, and browser games). More recently, the video game industry has expanded onto mobile gaming through mobile devices (such as smartphones and tablet computers), virtual and augmented reality systems, and remote cloud gaming. Video games are also classified into a wide range of genres based on their style of gameplay and target audience.

The first video game prototypes in the 1950s and 1960s were simple extensions of electronic games using video-like output from large, room-sized mainframe computers. The first consumer video game was the arcade video game Computer Space in 1971, which took inspiration from the earlier 1962 computer game Spacewar! In 1972 came the now-iconic video game Pong and the first home console, the Magnavox Odyssey. The industry grew quickly during the "golden age" of arcade video games from the late 1970s to early 1980s, and companies like Atari, Mattel, and Coleco also released highly successful consoles for the home market: however, loss of publishing control and saturation of the console gaming market led to the crash of the North American video game market in 1983. Following the crash, the industry matured and diversified: by the late 1980s video game consoles became dominated by Japanese companies such as Nintendo, Sega, and later Sony, whereas the Microsoft Windows (and MS-DOS before it) line of operating systems increasingly came to dominate the computer gaming space, with multiplayer online PC games seeing the establishment of the nascent eSports scene. Arcades on the other hand steadily lost their technological edge and popularity by the end of the 1990s in the face of advancements in the console and computer space, especially in North America and Europe, while in the handheld space Nintendo achieved dominance with the Game Boy line. By the 2000s, Sega exited the console space, and from then on the landscape has been dominated by the "big three" console manufacturers of Nintendo, Sony, and Microsoft. At this time the core industry also increasingly centered on "AAA" games, leaving less room for riskier, experimental, and lower-budget games. Coupled with increasing availability of high-speed Internet and digital distribution, this gave room for independent video game development (or "indie games") to gain prominence into the 2010s. Since then, the commercial importance of the video game industry has been increasing. The emerging Asian markets and proliferation of smartphone games in particular are altering player demographics towards casual and cozy gaming, and increasing monetization by incorporating games as a service.

Today, video game development requires numerous skills, vision, teamwork, and liaisons between different parties, including developers, publishers, distributors, retailers, hardware manufacturers, and other marketers, to successfully bring a game to its consumers. As of 2020, the global video game market had estimated annual revenues of US$159 billion across hardware, software, and services, which is three times the size of the global music industry and four times that of the film industry in 2019, making it a formidable heavyweight across the modern entertainment industry. The video game market is also a major influence behind the electronics industry, where personal computer component, console, and peripheral sales, as well as consumer demands for better game performance, have been powerful driving factors for hardware design and innovation.

== Origins ==
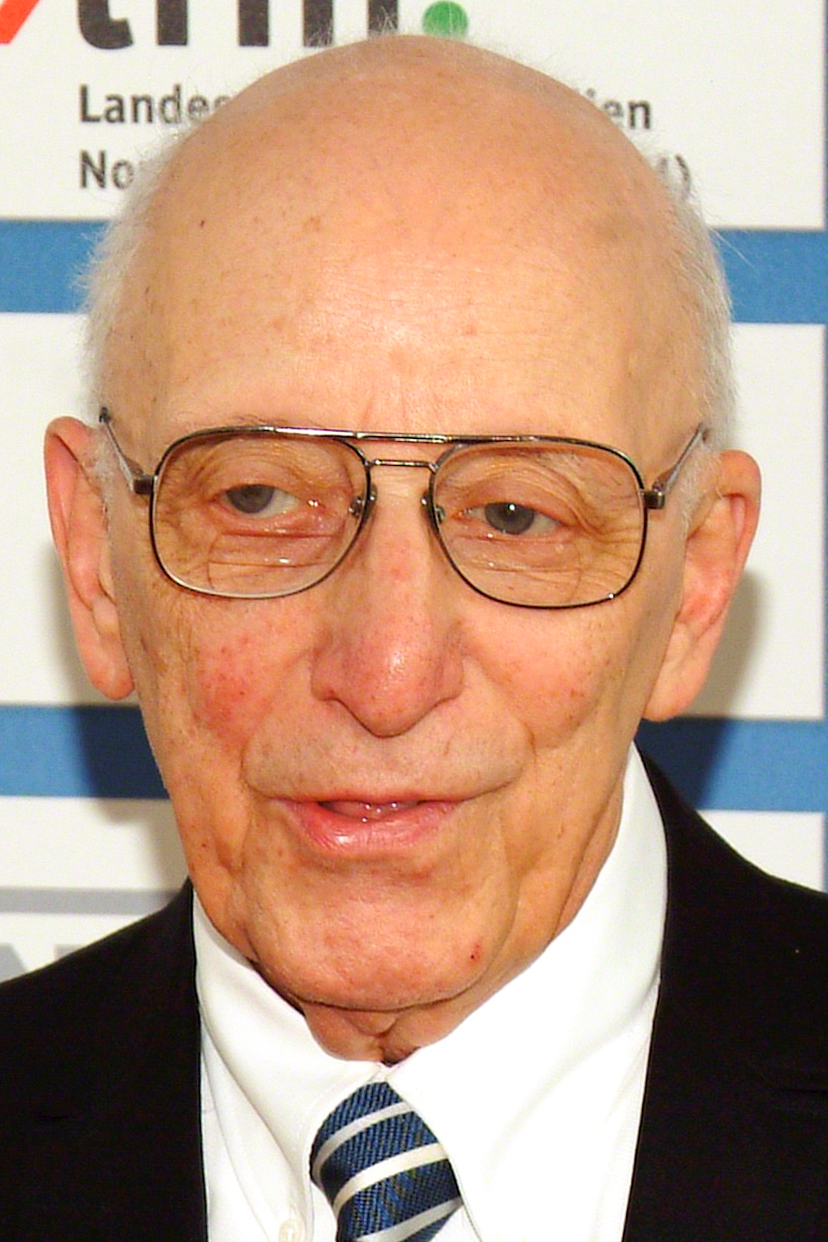
Baer in 2009

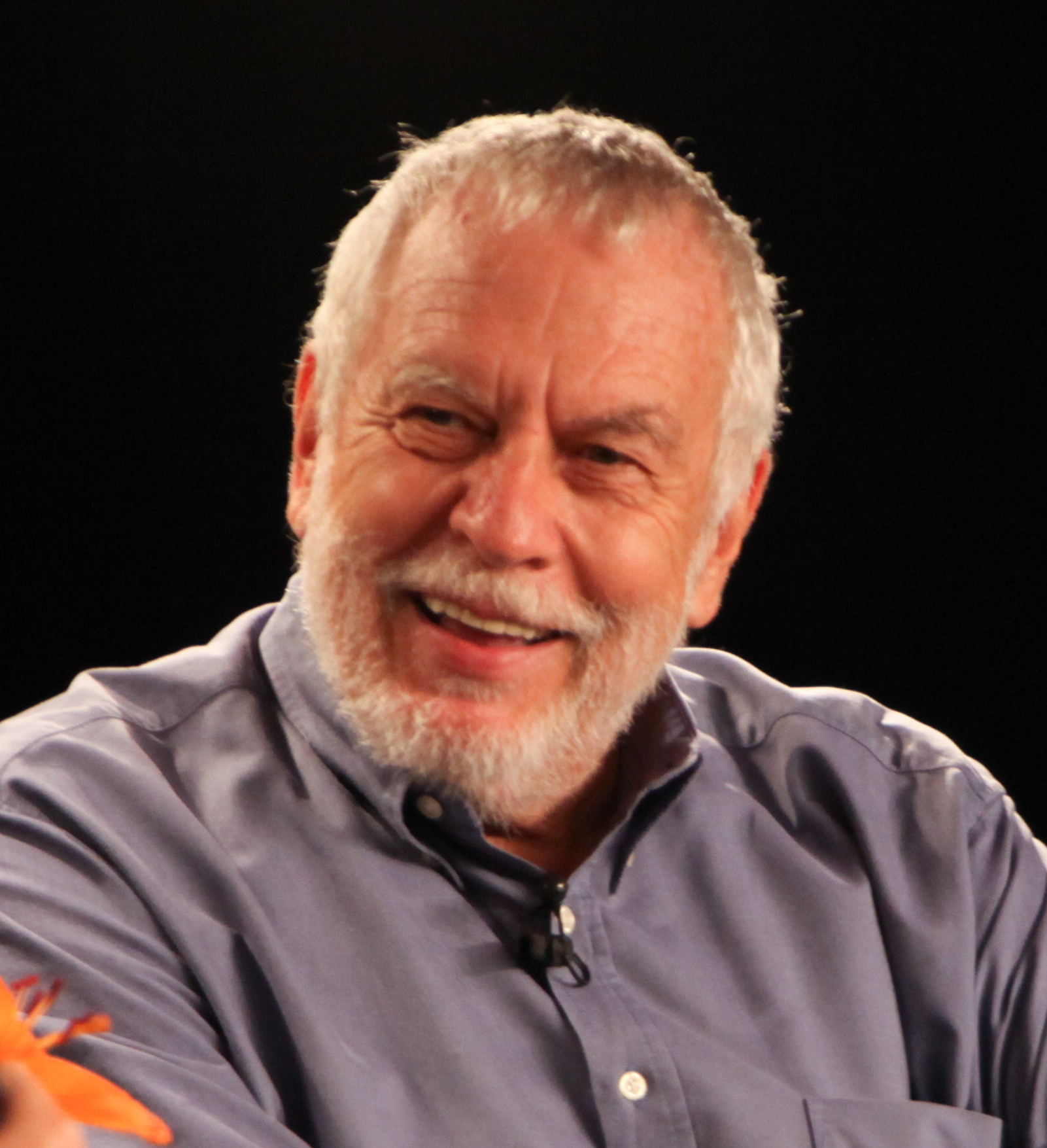
Bushnell in 2013

Ralph H. Baer and Nolan Bushnell have each been described as the "Father of Video Games" for their work in the field.

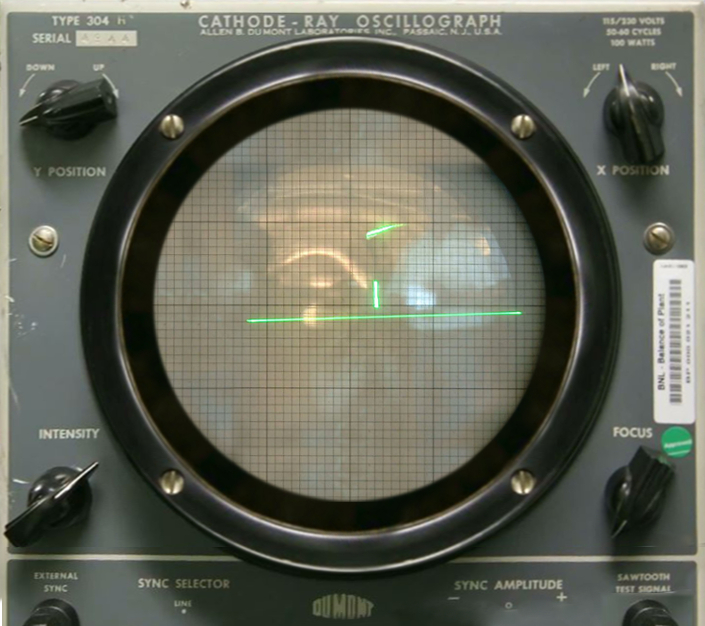
Tennis for Two (1958), an early analog computer game that used an oscilloscope for a display

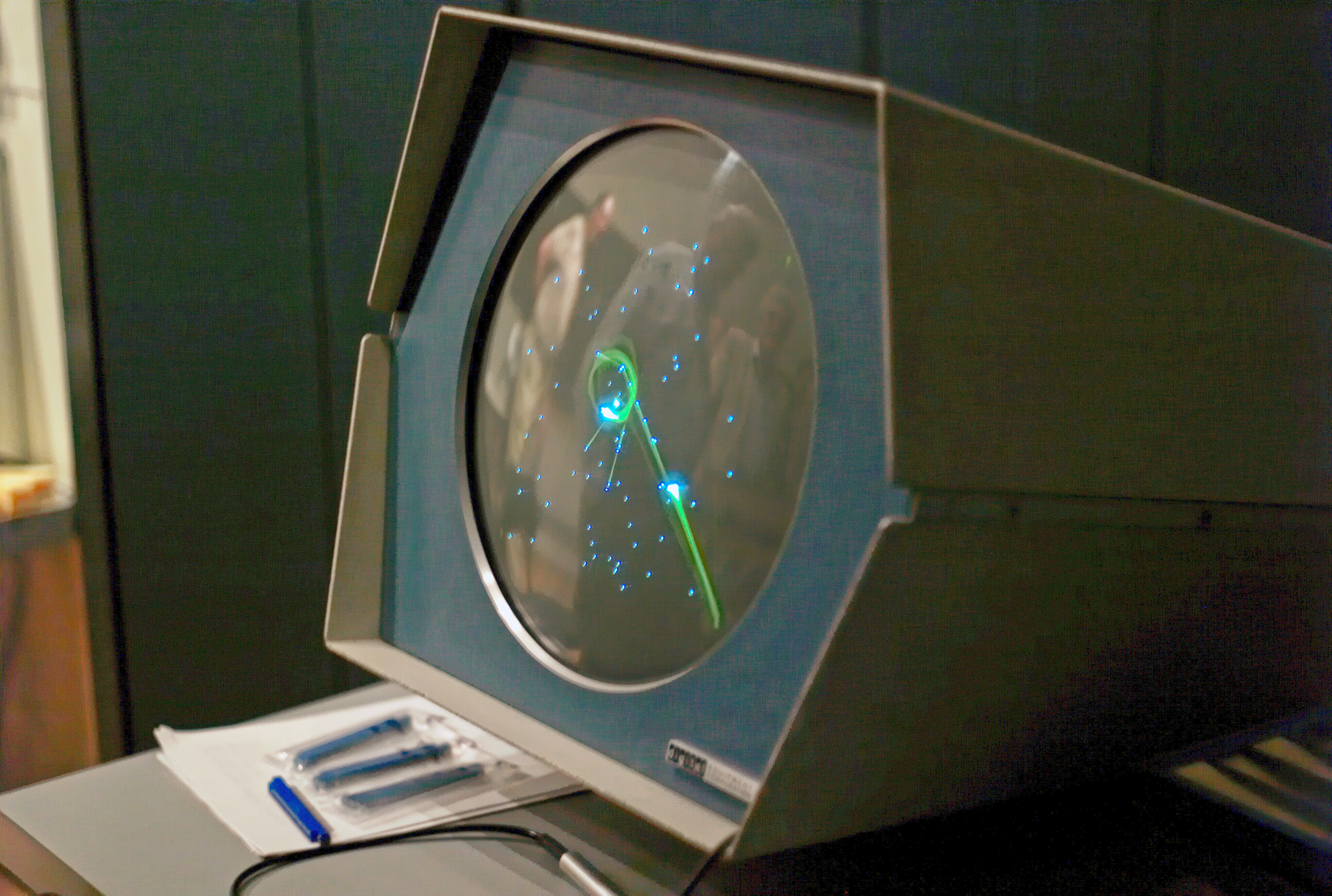
Spacewar! (1962), an early mainframe computer game, pictured running on a PDP-1 computer

Early video games used interactive electronic devices with various display formats. The earliest example dates to 1947—a "cathode-ray tube amusement device" was filed for a patent on 25 January 1947, by Thomas T. Goldsmith Jr. and Estle Ray Mann, and issued on 14 December 1948, as U.S. Patent 2455992. Inspired by radar display technology, it consisted of an analog device allowing a user to control the parabolic arc of a dot on the screen to simulate a missile being fired at targets, which were paper drawings fixed to the screen. Other early examples include the Nimrod computer at the 1951 Festival of Britain; Christopher Strachey's Checkers, possibly the first game to display visuals on an electronic screen in 1952; OXO, a tic-tac-toe computer game by Alexander S. Douglas for the EDSAC in 1952; Tennis for Two, an electronic interactive game engineered by William Higinbotham in 1958; and Spacewar!, written by Massachusetts Institute of Technology students Martin Graetz, Steve Russell, and Wayne Wiitanen's on a DEC PDP-1 computer in 1962. Each game had different means of display: NIMROD had a panel of lights to play the game of Nim, OXO had a graphical display to play tic-tac-toe, Tennis for Two had an oscilloscope to display a side view of a tennis court, and Spacewar! had the DEC PDP-1's vector display to have two spaceships battle each other.

These inventions laid the foundation for modern video games. In 1966, while working at Sanders Associates, Ralph H. Baer devised a system to play a basic table tennis game on a television screen. With the company's approval, Baer created the prototype known as the "Brown Box". Sanders patented Baer's innovations and licensed them to Magnavox, which commercialized the technology as the first home video game console, the Magnavox Odyssey, released in 1972. Separately, Nolan Bushnell and Ted Dabney, inspired by seeing Spacewar! running at Stanford University, devised a similar version running in a smaller coin-operated arcade cabinet using a less expensive computer. This was released as Computer Space, the first arcade video game, in 1971. Bushnell and Dabney went on to form Atari, Inc., and with Allan Alcorn, created their second arcade game in 1972, the hit ping pong-style Pong, which was directly inspired by the table tennis game on the Odyssey. Atari made a home version of Pong, which was released by Christmas 1975. The success of the Odyssey and Pong, both as an arcade game and home machine, launched the video game industry. Both Baer and Bushnell have been titled "Father of Video Games" for their contributions.

== Terminology ==
The term "video game" was developed to describe electronic games played on a video display rather than on a teletype printer, audio speaker, or similar device. This also distinguished from handheld electronic games such as Merlin, which commonly used LED lights for indicators not in combination for imaging purposes.

"Computer game" may also be used as a descriptor, as all these types of games essentially require the use of a computer processor; in some cases, it is used interchangeably with "video game". Particularly in the United Kingdom and Western Europe, this is common due to the historic relevance of domestically produced microcomputers. Other terms used include digital game, for example, by the Australian Bureau of Statistics. The term "computer game" can also refer to PC games, which are played primarily on personal computers or other flexible hardware systems, to distinguish them from console games, arcade games, or mobile games.

Other terms, such as "television game", "telegame", or "TV game", had been used in the 1970s and early 1980s, particularly for home gaming consoles that rely on connection to a television set. However, these terms were also used interchangeably with "video game" in the 1970s, primarily due to "video" and "television" being synonymous. In Japan, where consoles like the Odyssey were first imported and then made within the country by the large television manufacturers such as Toshiba and Sharp Corporation, such games are known as "TV games", "TV geemu", or "terebi geemu". The term "TV game" is still commonly used into the 21st century. "Electronic game" may also be used to refer to video games, but this also incorporates devices like early handheld electronic games that lack any video output.

The first appearance of the term "video game" emerged around 1973. The Oxford English Dictionary cited a 10 November 1973 BusinessWeek article as the first printed use of the term. Though Bushnell believed the term came from a vending magazine review of Computer Space in 1971, a review of the major vending magazines Vending Times and Cashbox showed that the term may have come even earlier, appearing first in a letter dated July 10, 1972. In the letter, Bushnell uses the term "video game" twice. Per video game historian Keith Smith, the sudden appearance suggested that the term had been proposed and readily adopted by those in the field. Around March 1973, Ed Adlum, who ran Cashbox's coin-operated section until 1972 and then later founded RePlay Magazine, covering the coin-op amusement field, in 1975, used the term in an article in March 1973. In a September 1982 issue of RePlay, Adlum is credited with first naming these games as "video games": "RePlay's Eddie Adlum worked at 'Cash Box' when 'TV games' first came out. The personalities in those days were Bushnell, his sales manager Pat Karns, and a handful of other 'TV game' manufacturers like Henry Leyser and the McEwan brothers. It seemed awkward to call their products 'TV games', so borrowing a word from Billboard's description of movie jukeboxes, Adlum started to refer to this new breed of amusement machine as 'video games.' The phrase stuck." Adlum explained in 1985 that up until the early 1970s, amusement arcades typically had non-video arcade games such as pinball machines and electro-mechanical games. With the arrival of video games in arcades during the early 1970s, there was initially some confusion in the arcade industry over what term should be used to describe the new games. He "wrestled with descriptions of this type of game," alternating between "TV game" and "television game" but "finally woke up one day" and said, "What the hell... video game!"

=== Definition ===
While many games readily fall into a clear, well-understood definition of video games, new genres and innovations in game development have raised the question of what are the essential factors of a video game that separate the medium from other forms of entertainment.

The introduction of interactive films in the 1980s with games like Dragon's Lair, featured games with full motion video played off a form of media but only limited user interaction. This had required a means to distinguish these games from more traditional board games that happen to also use external media, such as the Clue VCR Mystery Game which required players to watch VCR clips between turns. To distinguish between these two, video games are considered to require some interactivity that affects the visual display.

Most video games tend to feature some type of victory or winning conditions, such as a scoring mechanism or a final boss fight. The introduction of walking simulators (adventure games that allow for exploration but lack any objectives) like Gone Home, and empathy games (video games that tend to focus on emotion) like That Dragon, Cancer brought the idea of games that did not have any such type of winning condition and raising the question of whether these were actually games. These are still commonly justified as video games as they provide a game world that the player can interact with by some means.

The lack of any industry definition for a video game by 2021 was an issue during the case Epic Games v. Apple which dealt with video games offered on Apple's iOS App Store. Among concerns raised were games like Fortnite Creative and Roblox which created metaverses of interactive experiences, and whether the larger game and the individual experiences themselves were games or not in relation to fees that Apple charged for the App Store. Judge Yvonne Gonzalez Rogers, recognizing that there was yet an industry standard definition for a video game, established for her ruling that "At a bare minimum, video games appear to require some level of interactivity or involvement between the player and the medium" compared to passive entertainment like film, music, and television, and "videogames are also generally graphically rendered or animated, as opposed to being recorded live or via motion capture as in films or television". Rogers still concluded that what is a video game "appears highly eclectic and diverse".

=== Video game terminology ===
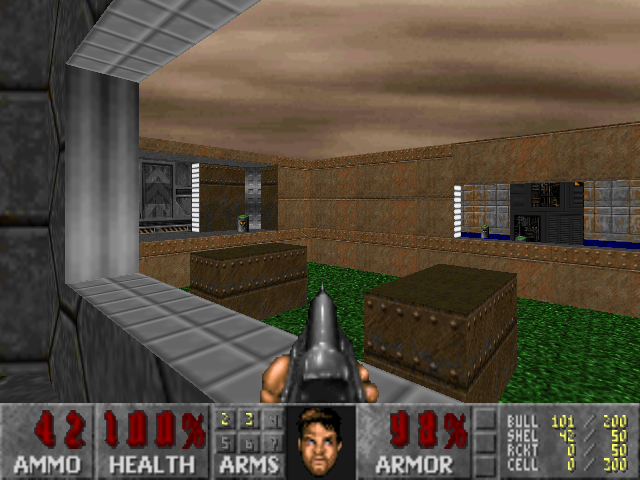
Freedoom, an open-source clone of the first-person shooter Doom. Common elements include a heads-up display along the bottom that includes the player's remaining health and ammunition.

The gameplay experience varies radically between video games, but many common elements exist. Most games will launch into a title screen and give the player a chance to review options such as the number of players before starting a game. Most games are divided into levels which the player must work the avatar through, scoring points, collecting power-ups to boost the avatar's innate attributes, all while either using special attacks to defeat enemies or moves to avoid them. This information is relayed to the player through a type of on-screen user interface such as a heads-up display atop the rendering of the game itself. Taking damage will deplete their avatar's health, and if that falls to zero or if the avatar otherwise falls into an impossible-to-escape location, the player will lose one of their lives. Should they lose all their lives without gaining an extra life or "1-UP", then the player will reach the "game over" screen. Many levels as well as the game's finale end with a type of boss character the player must defeat to continue on. In some games, intermediate points between levels will offer save points where the player can create a saved game on storage media to restart the game should they lose all their lives or need to stop the game and restart at a later time. These also may be in the form of a passage that can be written down and reentered at the title screen.

Product flaws include software bugs which can manifest as glitches which may be exploited by the player; this is often the foundation of speedrunning a video game. These bugs, along with cheat codes, Easter eggs, and other hidden secrets that were intentionally added to the game can also be exploited. On some consoles, cheat cartridges allow players to execute these cheat codes, and user-developed trainers allow similar bypassing for computer software games. Both of which might make the game easier, give the player additional power-ups, or change the appearance of the game.

== Components ==
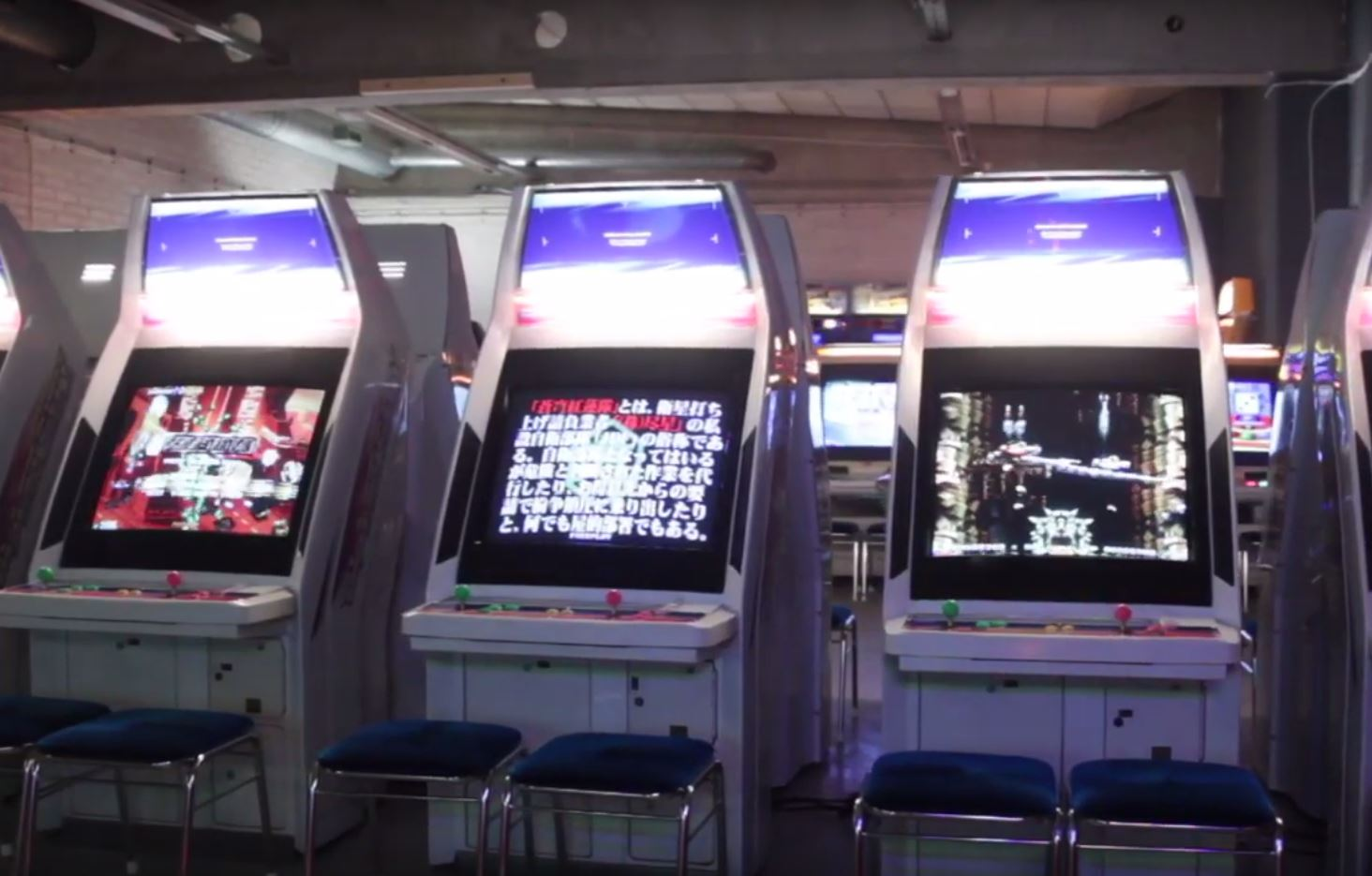
Arcade video game machines at the Sugoi arcade game hall in Malmi, Helsinki, Finland

To distinguish from electronic games, a video game is generally considered to require a platform, the hardware which contains computing elements, to process player interaction from some type of input device and displays the results to a video output display.

=== Platform ===
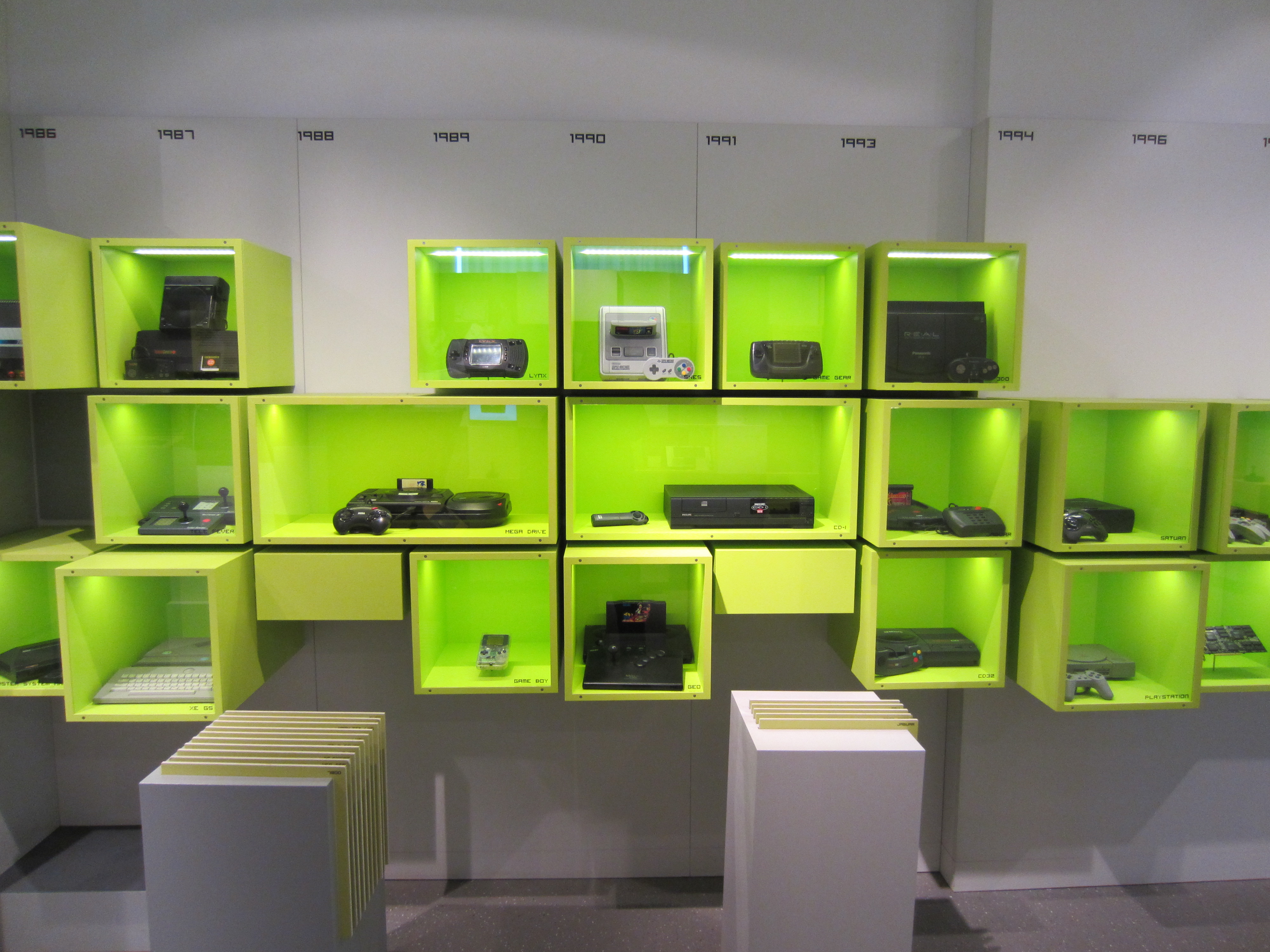
Various gaming consoles at the Computer Games Museum in Berlin

Video games require a platform, a specific combination of electronic components or computer hardware and associated software, to operate. The term system is also commonly used. These platforms may include multiple brandsheld by platform holders, such as Nintendo or Sony, seeking to gain larger market shares. Games are typically designed to be played on one or a limited number of platforms, and exclusivity to a platform or brand is used by platform holders as a competitive edge in the video game market. However, games may be developed for alternative platforms than intended, which are described as ports or conversions. These also may be remasters - where most of the original game's source code is reused and art assets, models, and game levels are updated for modern systems – and remakes, where in addition to asset improvements, significant reworking of the original game and possibly from scratch is performed.

The list below is not exhaustive and excludes other electronic devices capable of playing video games such as PDAs and graphing calculators.

PC games
PC games involve a player interacting with a personal computer (PC) connected to a video monitor. Personal computers are not dedicated game platforms, so there may be differences running the same game on different hardware. Also, the openness allows some features to developers like reduced software cost, increased flexibility, increased innovation, emulation, creation of modifications or mods, open hosting for online gaming (in which a person plays a video game with people who are in a different household) and others. A gaming computer is a PC or laptop intended specifically for gaming, typically using high-performance, high-cost components. In addition to personal computer gaming, there also exist games that work on mainframe computers and other similarly shared systems, with users logging in remotely to use the computer.
Home console

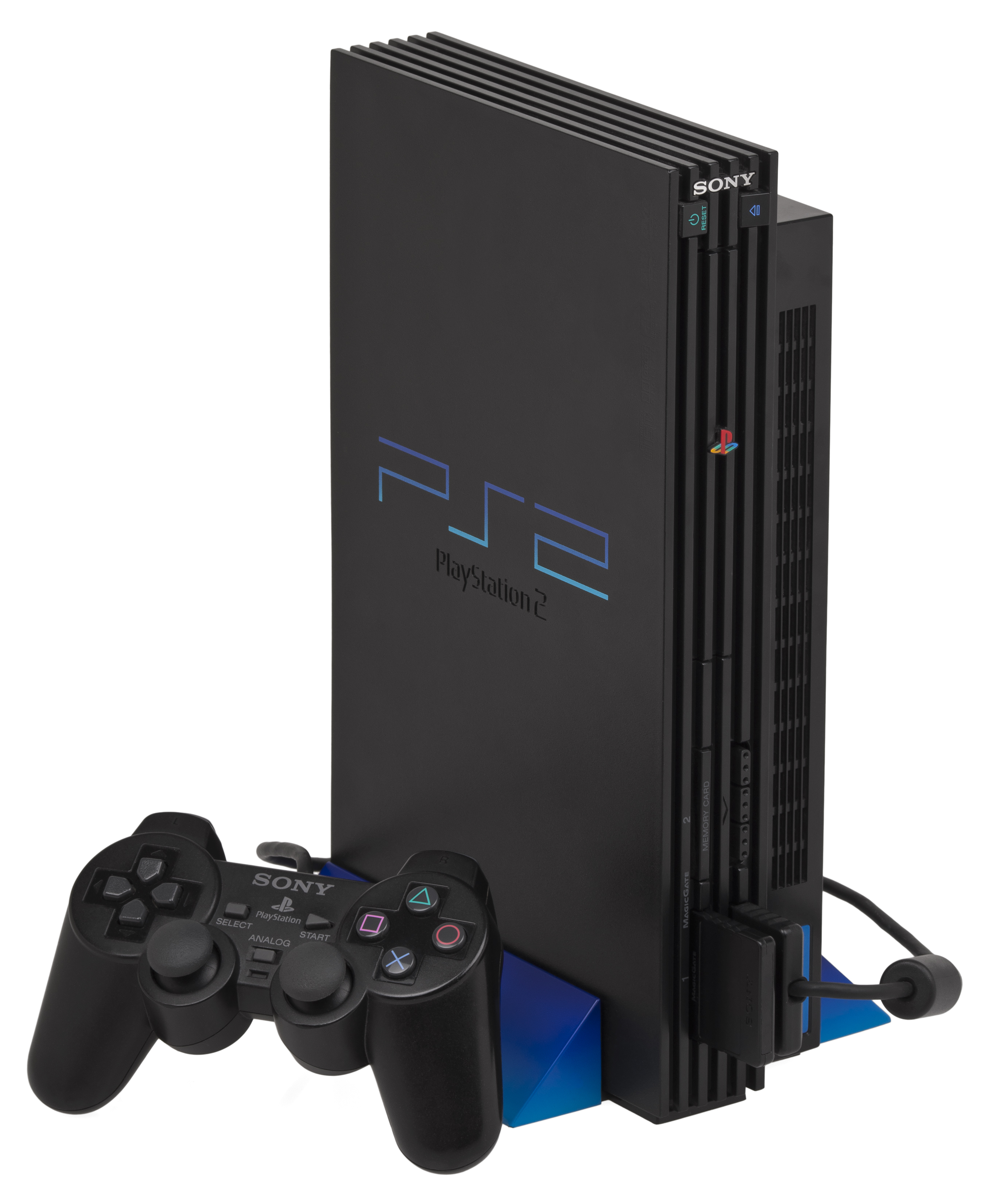
The PlayStation 2 is the best-selling video game console, with over 155 million units sold.

A console game is played on a home console, a specialized electronic device that connects to a common television set or composite video monitor. Home consoles are specifically designed to play games using a dedicated hardware environment, giving developers a concrete hardware target for development and assurances of what features will be available, simplifying development compared to PC game development. Usually consoles only run games developed for it, or games from other platform made by the same company, but never games developed by its direct competitor, even if the same game is available on different platforms. It often comes with a specific game controller. Major console platforms include Xbox, PlayStation and Nintendo.
Handheld console
A handheld game console is a small, self-contained electronic device that is portable and can be held in a user's hands. It features the console, a small screen, speakers and buttons, joystick or other game controllers in a single unit. Like consoles, handhelds are dedicated platforms, and share almost the same characteristics. Handheld hardware usually is less powerful than PC or console hardware. Some handheld games from the late 1970s and early 1980s could only play one game. In the 1990s and 2000s, a number of handheld games used cartridges, which enabled them to be used to play many different games. The handheld console has waned in the 2010s as mobile device gaming has become a more dominant factor.
Arcade video game

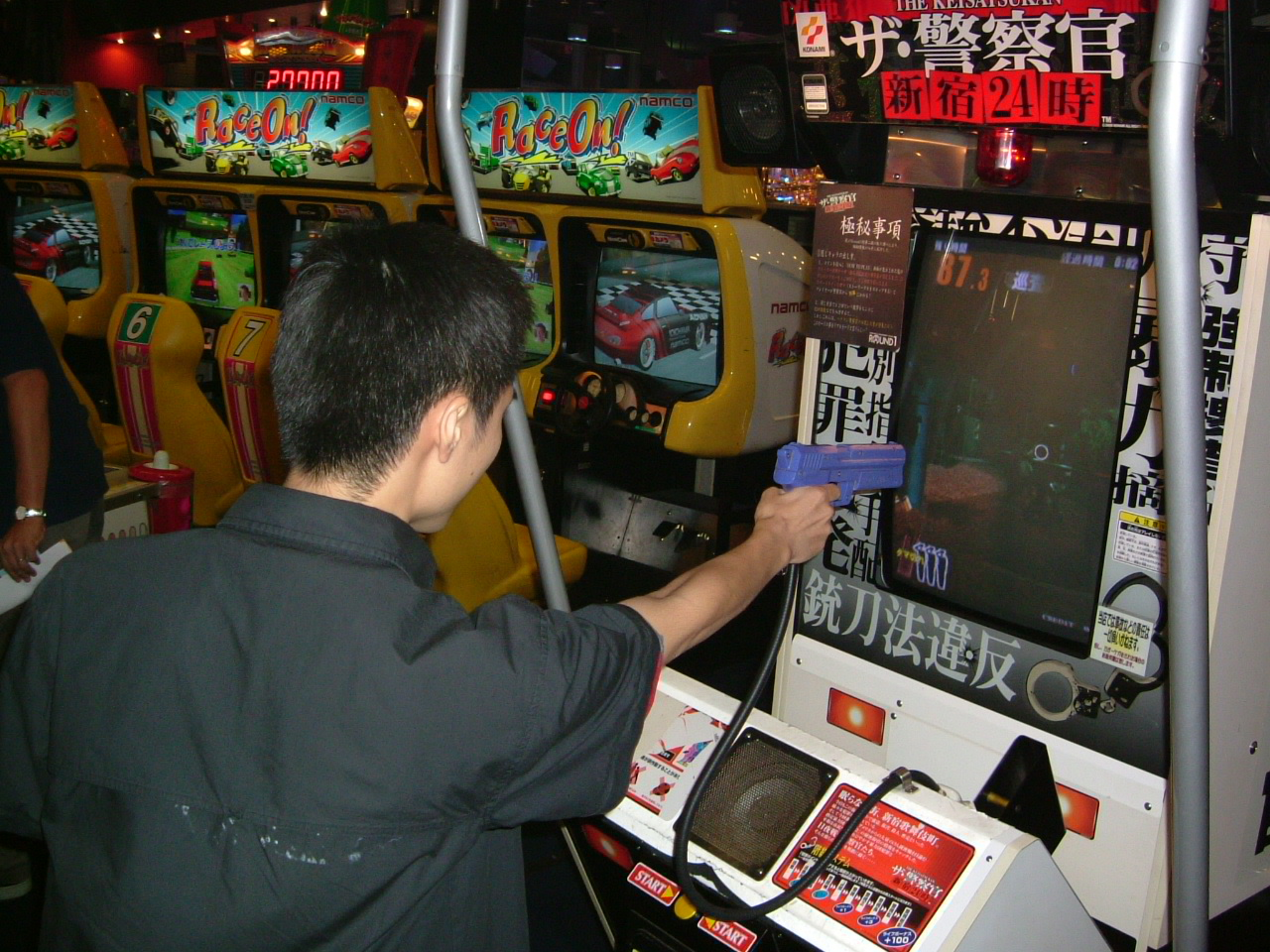
A police-themed arcade game in which players use a light gun

An arcade video game generally refers to a game played on an even more specialized type of electronic device that is typically designed to play only one game and is encased in a special, large coin-operated cabinet which has one built-in console, controllers (joystick, buttons, etc.), a CRT screen, and audio amplifier and speakers. Arcade games often have brightly painted logos and images relating to the theme of the game. While most arcade games are housed in a vertical cabinet, which the user typically stands in front of to play, some arcade games use a tabletop approach, in which the display screen is housed in a table-style cabinet with a see-through table top. With table-top games, the users typically sit to play. In the 1990s and 2000s, some arcade games offered players a choice of multiple games. In the 1980s, video arcades were businesses in which game players could use a number of arcade video games. In the 2010s, there are far fewer video arcades, but some movie theaters and family entertainment centers still have them.
Browser game
A browser game takes advantages of standardizations of technologies for the functionality of web browsers across multiple devices providing a cross-platform environment. These games may be identified based on the website that they appear, such as with Miniclip games. Others are named based on the programming platform used to develop them, such as Java and Flash games.
Mobile game
With the introduction of smartphones and tablet computers standardized on the iOS and Android operating systems, mobile gaming has become a significant platform. These games may use unique features of mobile devices that are not necessary present on other platforms, such as accelerometers, global positioning information and camera devices to support augmented reality gameplay.
Cloud gaming
Cloud gaming requires a minimal hardware device, such as a basic computer, console, laptop, mobile phone or even a dedicated hardware device connected to a display with good Internet connectivity that connects to hardware systems by the cloud gaming provider. The game is computed and rendered on the remote hardware, using a number of predictive methods to reduce the network latency between player input and output on their display device. For example, the Xbox Cloud Gaming and PlayStation Now platforms use dedicated custom server blade hardware in cloud computing centers.
Virtual reality

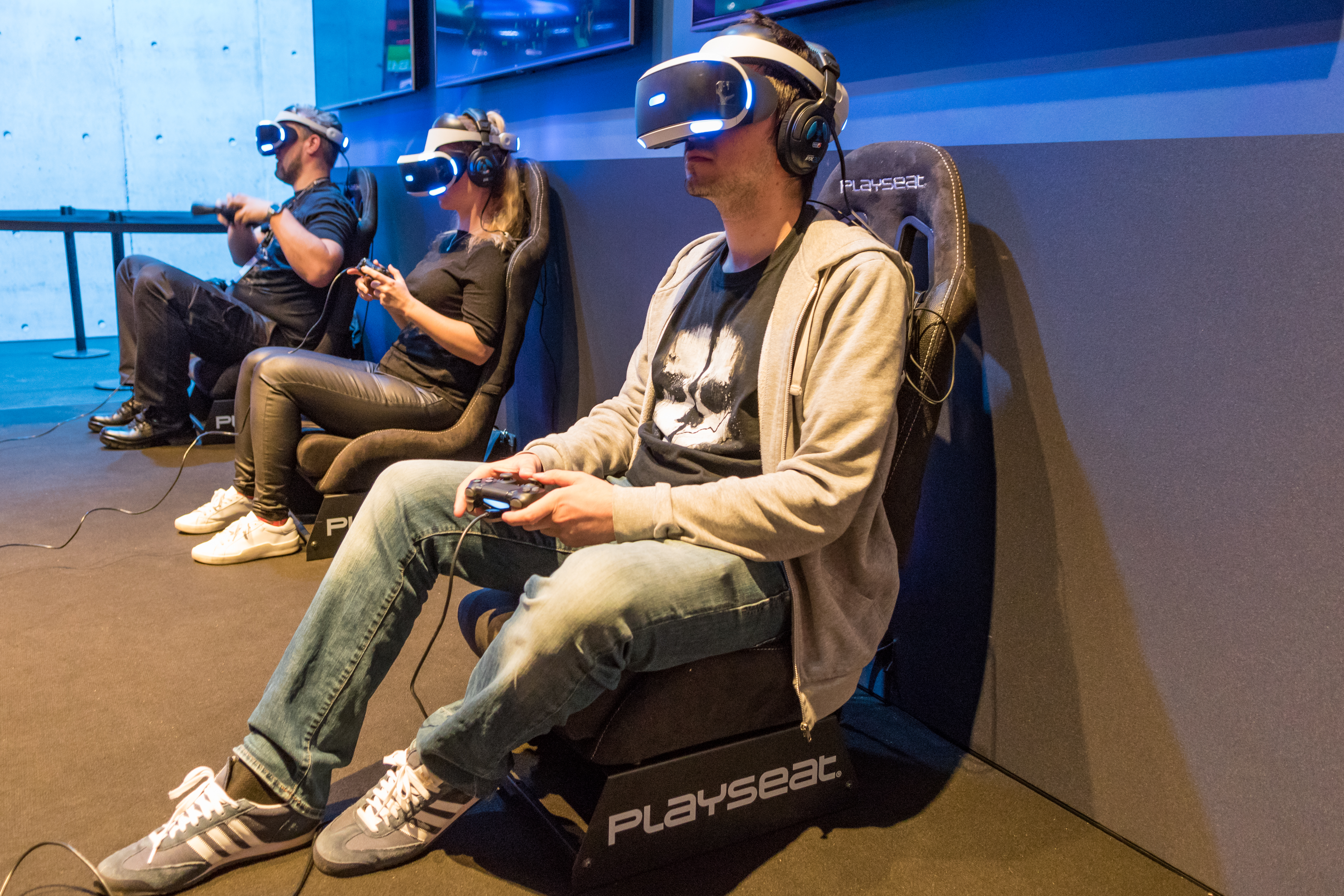
Players using the PlayStation VR headsets in 2017

Virtual reality (VR) games generally require players to use a special head-mounted unit that provides stereoscopic screens and motion tracking to immerse a player within virtual environment that responds to their head movements. Some VR systems include control units for the player's hands as to provide a direct way to interact with the virtual world. VR systems generally require a separate computer, console, or other processing device that couples with the head-mounted unit.
Emulation
An emulator enables games from a console or otherwise different system to be run in a type of virtual machine on a modern system, simulating the hardware of the original and allows old games to be played. While emulators themselves have been found to be legal in United States case law, the act of obtaining the game software that one does not already own may violate copyrights. However, there are some official releases of emulated software from game manufacturers, such as Nintendo with its Virtual Console or Nintendo Switch Online offerings.
Backward compatibility
Backward compatibility is similar in nature to emulation in that older games can be played on newer platforms, but typically directly though hardware and built-in software within the platform. The PlayStation 2 popularized the trend by having the capability of playing past generation games from the PlayStation via inserting the original game media into the newer console, while Nintendo's Wii could play GameCube titles as well in the same manner.

=== Game media ===
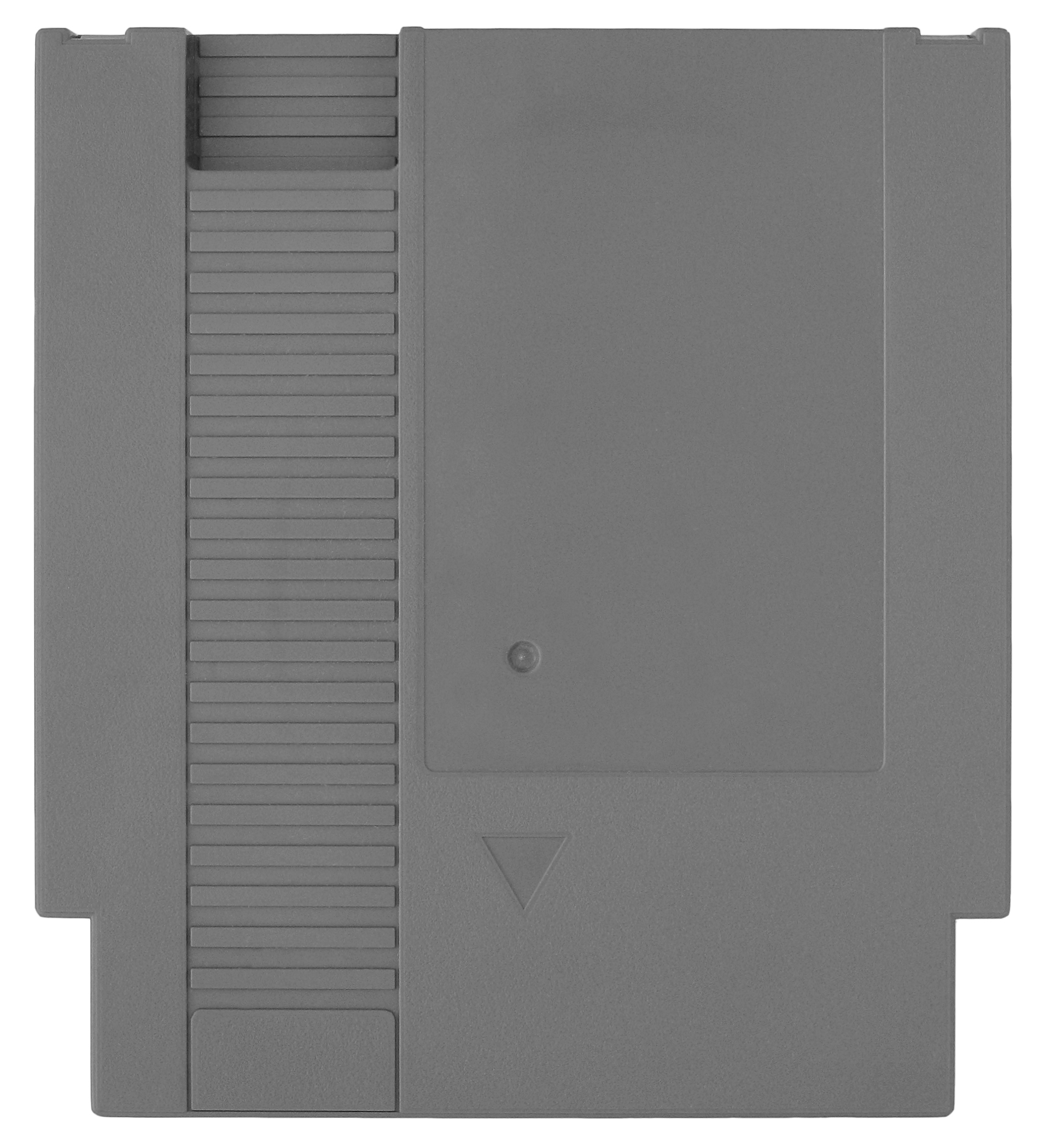
An unlabeled game cartridge for the Nintendo Entertainment System

Early arcade games, home consoles, and handheld games were dedicated hardware units with the game's logic built into the electronic componentry of the hardware. Since then, most video game platforms are considered programmable, having means to read and play multiple games distributed on different types of media or formats. Physical formats include ROM cartridges, magnetic storage including magnetic-tape data storage and floppy discs, optical media formats including CD-ROM and DVDs, and flash memory cards. Furthermore digital distribution over the Internet or other communication methods as well as cloud gaming alleviate the need for any physical media. In some cases, the media serves as the direct read-only memory for the game, or it may be the form of installation media that is used to write the main assets to the player's platform's local storage for faster loading periods and later updates.

Games can be extended with new content and software patches through either expansion packs which are typically available as physical media, or as downloadable content nominally available via digital distribution. These can be offered freely or can be used to monetize a game following its initial release. Several games offer players the ability to create user-generated content to share with others to play. Other games, mostly those on personal computers, can be extended with user-created modifications or mods that alter or add onto the game; these often are unofficial and were developed by players from reverse engineering of the game, but other games provide official support for modding the game.

=== Input device ===
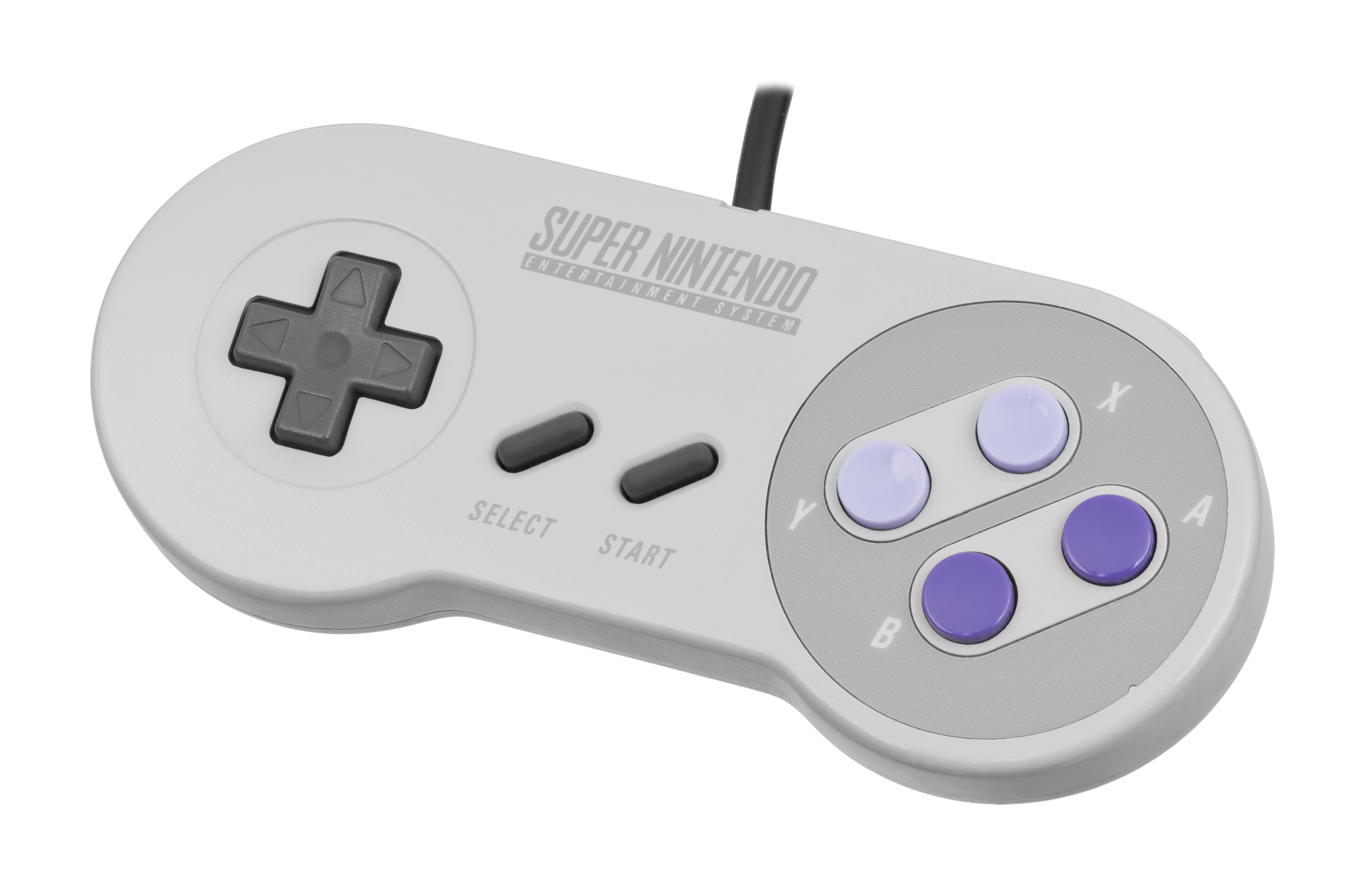
A North American Super NES game controller from the early 1990s

Video games may use several types of input devices to translate human actions to a game. Most common is the use of game controllers like gamepads and joysticks for most consoles, and as accessories for personal computer systems along keyboard and mouse controls. Common controls on the most recent controllers include face buttons, shoulder triggers, analog sticks, and directional pads ("d-pads"). Consoles typically include standard controllers which are shipped or bundled with the console itself, while peripheral controllers are available as a separate purchase from the console manufacturer or third-party vendors. Similar control sets are built into handheld consoles and onto arcade cabinets. Newer technology improvements have incorporated additional technology into the controller or the game platform, such as touchscreens and motion detection sensors that give more options for how the player interacts with the game. Specialized controllers may be used for certain genres of games, including racing wheels, light guns and dance pads. Digital cameras, microphones and motion detectors can capture sound and movement from the player as input into the game, which can, in some cases, effectively eliminate the control, and on other systems such as virtual reality, are used to enhance immersion into the game.

=== Display and output ===
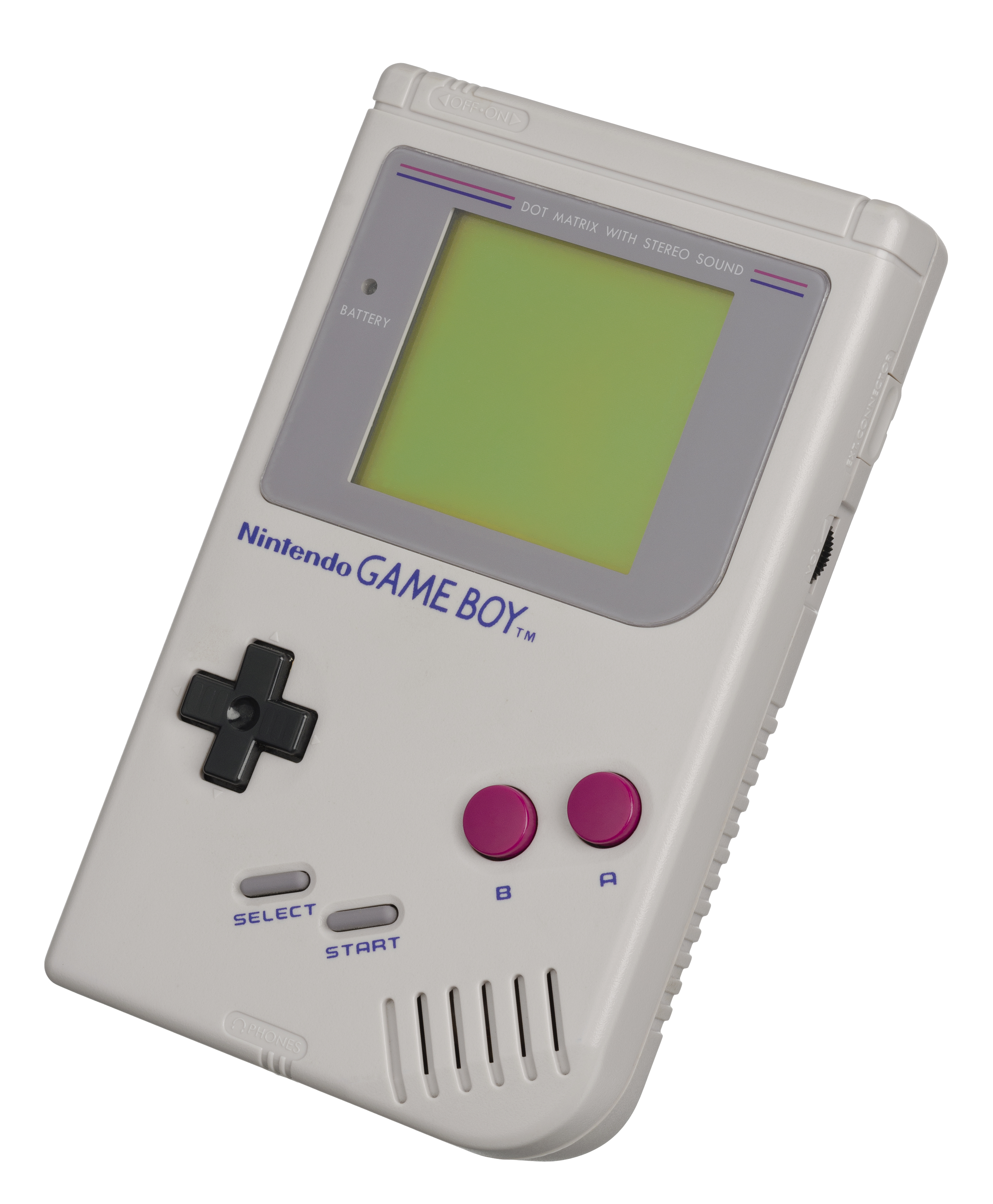
Handheld units, like the Game Boy, include built-in output screens and sound speakers.

By definition, all video games are intended to output graphics to an external video display, such as cathode ray tube televisions, newer liquid-crystal display (LCD) televisions and built-in screens, projectors or computer monitors, depending on the type of platform the game is played on. Features such as color depth, refresh rate, frame rate, and screen resolution are a combination of the limitations of the game platform and display device and the program efficiency of the game itself. The game's output can range from fixed displays using LED or LCD elements, text-based games, two-dimensional and three-dimensional graphics, and augmented reality displays.

The game's graphics are often accompanied by sound produced by internal speakers on the game platform or external speakers attached to the platform, as directed by the game's programming. This often will include sound effects tied to the player's actions to provide audio feedback, as well as background music for the game.

Some platforms support additional feedback mechanics to the player that a game can take advantage of. This is most commonly haptic technology built into the game controller, such as causing the controller to shake in the player's hands to simulate a shaking earthquake occurring in game.

== Classifications ==
Video games are frequently classified by a number of factors related to how one plays them.

=== Genre ===
Dustforce is representative of the platform game genre as its gameplay involves jumping between platforms.

A video game, like most other forms of media, may be categorized into genres. However, unlike film or television which use visual or narrative elements, video games are generally categorized into genres based on their gameplay interaction, since this is the primary means which one interacts with a video game. The narrative setting does not impact gameplay; a shooter game is still a shooter game, regardless of whether it takes place in a fantasy world or in outer space. An exception is the horror game genre, used for games that are based on narrative elements of horror fiction, the supernatural, and psychological horror.

Genre names are normally self-describing in terms of the type of gameplay, such as action game, role playing game, or shoot 'em up, though some genres have derivations from influential works that have defined that genre, such as roguelikes from Rogue, Grand Theft Auto clones from Grand Theft Auto III, and battle royale games from the film Battle Royale. The names may shift over time as players, developers and the media come up with new terms; for example, first-person shooters were originally called "Doom clones" based on the 1993 game. A hierarchy of game genres exist, with top-level genres like "shooter game" and "action game" that broadly capture the game's main gameplay style, and several subgenres of specific implementation, such as within the shooter game first-person shooter and third-person shooter. Some cross-genre types also exist that fall until multiple top-level genres such as action-adventure game.

=== Mode ===
A LAN party at the 2004 DreamHack with hundreds of players

A video game's mode describes how many players can use the game at the same type. This is primarily distinguished by single-player video games and multiplayer video games. Within the latter category, multiplayer games can be played in a variety of ways, including locally at the same device, on separate devices connected through a local network such as LAN parties, or online via separate Internet connections. Most multiplayer games are based on competitive gameplay, but many offer cooperative and team-based options as well as asymmetric gameplay. Online games use server structures that can also enable massively multiplayer online games (MMOs) to support hundreds of players at the same time.

A small number of video games are zero-player games, in which the player has very limited interaction with the game itself. These are most commonly simulation games where the player may establish a starting state and then let the game proceed on its own, watching the results as a passive observer, such as with many computerized simulations of Conway's Game of Life.

=== Types ===
Most video games are intended for entertainment purposes. Different game types include:

Core games
Core or hard-core games refer to the typical perception of video games, developed for entertainment purposes. These games typically require a fair amount of time to learn and master, in contrast to casual games, and thus are most appealing to gamers rather than a broader audience. Most of the AAA video game industry is based around the delivery of core games.

Casual games
In contrast to core games, casual games are designed for ease of accessibility, simple to understand gameplay and quick to grasp rule sets, and aimed at mass market audience. They frequently support the ability to jump in and out of play on demand, such as during commuting or lunch breaks. Numerous browser and mobile games fall into the casual game area, and casual games often are from genres with low intensity game elements such as match three, hidden object, time management, and puzzle games. Causal games frequently use social-network game mechanics, where players can enlist the help of friends on their social media networks for extra turns or moves each day. Popular casual games include Tetris and Candy Crush Saga. More recent, starting in the late 2010s, are hyper-casual games which use even more simplistic rules for short but infinitely replayable games, such as Flappy Bird.
Educational games
Education software has been used in homes and classrooms to help teach children and students, and video games have been similarly adapted for these reasons, all designed to provide a form of interactivity and entertainment tied to game design elements. There are a variety of differences in their designs and how they educate the user. These are broadly split between edutainment games that tend to focus on the entertainment value and rote learning but are unlikely to engage in critical thinking, and educational video games that are geared towards problem solving through motivation and positive reinforcement while downplaying the entertainment value. Examples of educational games include The Oregon Trail and the Carmen Sandiego series. Further, games not initially developed for educational purposes have found their way into the classroom after release, such as that feature open worlds or virtual sandboxes like Minecraft, or offer critical thinking skills through puzzle video games like SpaceChem.
Serious games

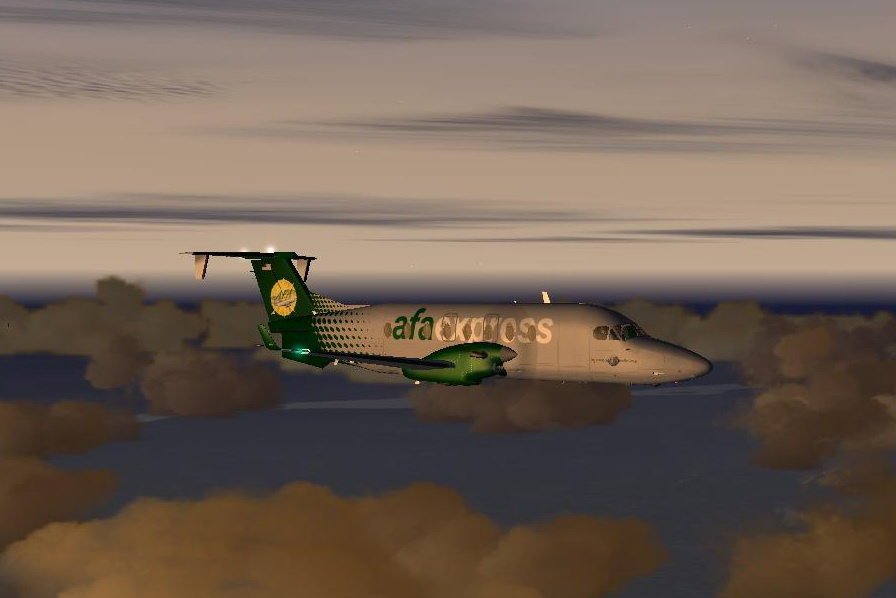
Microsoft Flight Simulator is an example of a simulation game.

Further extending from educational games, serious games are those where the entertainment factor may be augmented, overshadowed, or even eliminated by other purposes for the game. Game design is used to reinforce the non-entertainment purpose of the game, such as using video game technology for the game's interactive world, or gamification for reinforcement training. Educational games are a form of serious games, but other types of games include fitness games that incorporate significant physical exercise to help keep the player fit (such as Wii Fit), simulator games that resemble flight simulators to pilot aircraft (such as Microsoft Flight Simulator), advergames that are built around the advertising of a product (such as Pepsiman), and newsgames aimed at conveying a specific advocacy message (such as NarcoGuerra).
Art games
Although video games have been considered an art form on their own, games may be developed to try to purposely communicate a story or message, using the medium as a work of art. These art or arthouse games are designed to generate emotion and empathy from the player by challenging societal norms and offering critique through the interactivity of the video game medium. They may not have any type of win condition and are designed to let the player explore through the game world and scenarios. Most art games are indie games in nature, designed based on personal experiences or stories through a single developer or small team. Examples of art games include Passage, Flower, and That Dragon, Cancer.

=== Content rating ===
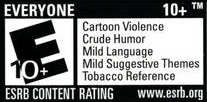
A typical ESRB rating label, listing the rating and specific content descriptors for Rabbids Go Home

Video games can be subject to national and international content rating requirements. Like with film content ratings, video game ratings typing identify the target age group that the national or regional ratings board believes is appropriate for the player, ranging from all-ages, to a teenager-or-older, to mature, to the infrequent adult-only games. Most content review is based on the level of violence, both in the type of violence and how graphic it may be represented, and sexual content, but other themes such as drug and alcohol use and gambling that can influence children may also be identified. A primary identifier based on a minimum age is used by nearly all systems, along with additional descriptors to identify specific content that players and parents should be aware of.

The regulations vary from country to country but generally are voluntary systems upheld by vendor practices, with penalty and fines issued by the ratings body on the video game publisher for misuse of the ratings. Among the major content rating systems include:

- Entertainment Software Rating Board (ESRB) that oversees games released in the United States. ESRB ratings are voluntary and rated along a E (Everyone), E10+ (Everyone 10 and older), T (Teen), M (Mature), and AO (Adults Only). Attempts to mandate video games ratings in the U.S. subsequently led to the landmark Supreme Court case, Brown v. Entertainment Merchants Association in 2011 which ruled video games were a protected form of art, a key victory for the video game industry.
- Pan European Game Information (PEGI) covering the United Kingdom, most of the European Union and other European countries, replacing previous national-based systems. The PEGI system uses content rated based on minimum recommended ages, which include 3+, 8+, 12+, 16+, and 18+.
- Australian Classification Board (ACB) oversees the ratings of games and other works in Australia, using ratings of G (General), PG (Parental Guidance), M (Mature), MA15+ (Mature Accompanied), R18+ (Restricted), and X (Restricted for pornographic material). ACB can also deny to give a rating to game (RC – Refused Classification). The ACB's ratings are enforceable by law, and importantly, games cannot be imported or purchased digitally in Australia if they have failed to gain a rating or were given the RC rating, leading to a number of notable banned games.
- Computer Entertainment Rating Organization (CERO) rates games for Japan. Their ratings include A (all ages), B (12 and older), C (15 and over), D (17 and over), and Z (18 and over).
- Unterhaltungssoftware Selbstkontrolle (USK) rates games for Germany. Their ratings include 0, 6, 12, 16, and 18.

Additionally, the major content system provides have worked to create the International Age Rating Coalition (IARC), a means to streamline and align the content ratings system between different region, so that a publisher would only need to complete the content ratings review for one provider, and use the IARC transition to affirm the content rating for all other regions.

Certain nations have even more restrictive rules related to political or ideological content. Within Germany, until 2018, the Unterhaltungssoftware Selbstkontrolle (Entertainment Software Self-Regulation) would refuse to classify, and thus allow sale, of any game depicting Nazi imagery, and thus often requiring developers to replace such imagery with fictional ones. This ruling was relaxed in 2018 to allow for such imagery for "social adequacy" purposes that applied to other works of art. China's video game segment is mostly isolated from the rest of the world due to the government's censorship, and all games published there must adhere to strict government review, disallowing content such as smearing the image of the Chinese Communist Party. Foreign games published in China often require modification by developers and publishers to meet these requirements.

== Development ==
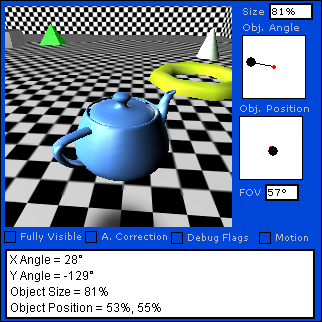
Developers use various tools to create video games. Here an editor is fine-tuning the virtual camera system.

Video game development and authorship, much like any other form of entertainment, is frequently a cross-disciplinary field. Video game developers, as employees within this industry are commonly referred to, primarily include programmers and graphic designers. Over the years, this has expanded to include almost every type of skill that one might see prevalent in the creation of any movie or television program, including sound designers, musicians, and other technicians; as well as skills that are specific to video games, such as the game designer. All of these are managed by producers.

In the early days of the industry, it was more common for a single person to manage all of the roles needed to create a video game. As platforms have become more complex and powerful in the type of material they can present, larger teams have been needed to generate all of the art, programming, cinematography, and more. This is not to say that the age of the "one-man shop" is gone, as this is still sometimes found in the casual gaming and handheld markets, where smaller games are prevalent due to technical limitations such as limited RAM or lack of dedicated 3D graphics rendering capabilities on the target platform (e.g., some PDAs).

Video games are programmed like any other piece of computer software. Prior to the mid-1970s, arcade and home consoles were programmed by assembling discrete electro-mechanical components on circuit boards, which limited games to relatively simple logic. By 1975, low-cost microprocessors were available at volume to be used for video game hardware, which allowed game developers to program more detailed games, widening the scope of what was possible. Ongoing improvements in computer hardware technology have expanded what has become possible to create in video games, coupled with convergence of common hardware between console, computer, and arcade platforms to simplify the development process. Today, game developers have a number of commercial and open source tools available for use to make games, often which are across multiple platforms to support portability, or may still opt to create their own for more specialized features and direct control of the game. Today, many games are built around a game engine that handles the bulk of the game's logic, gameplay, and rendering. These engines can be augmented with specialized engines for specific features, such as a physics engine that simulates the physics of objects in real-time. A variety of middleware exists to help developers access other features, such as playback of videos within games, network-oriented code for games that communicate via online services, matchmaking for online games, and similar features. These features can be used from a developer's programming language of choice, or they may opt to also use game development kits that minimize the amount of direct programming they have to do but can also limit the amount of customization they can add into a game. Like all software, video games usually undergo quality testing before release to assure there are no bugs or glitches in the product, though frequently developers will release patches and updates.

With the growth of the size of development teams in the industry, the problem of cost has increased. Development studios need the best talent, while publishers reduce costs to maintain profitability on their investment. Typically, a video game console development team ranges from 5 to 50 people, and some exceed 100. In May 2009, Assassin's Creed II was reported to have a development staff of 450. The growth of team size combined with greater pressure to get completed projects into the market to begin recouping production costs has led to a greater occurrence of missed deadlines, rushed games, and the release of unfinished products.

While amateur and hobbyist game programming had existed since the late 1970s with the introduction of home computers, a newer trend since the mid-2000s is indie game development. Indie games are made by small teams outside any direct publisher control, their games being smaller in scope than those from the larger "AAA" game studios, and are often experiments in gameplay and art style. Indie game development is aided by the larger availability of digital distribution, including the newer mobile gaming market, and readily-available and low-cost development tools for these platforms.

=== Game theory and studies ===
Although departments of computer science have been studying technical aspects of video games for years, theories that examine games as an artistic medium are a relatively recent development. The two most visible schools in this field are ludology and narratology. Narrativists approach video games in the context of what Janet Murray calls "Cyberdrama". That is to say, their major concern is with video games as a storytelling medium, one that arises out of interactive fiction. Murray puts video games in the context of the Holodeck, a fictional piece of technology from Star Trek, arguing for the video game as a medium in which the player is allowed to become another person, and to act out in another world. This image of video games received early widespread popular support, and forms the basis of films such as Tron, eXistenZ and The Last Starfighter.

Ludologists break sharply and radically from this idea. They argue that a video game is first and foremost a game, which must be understood in terms of its rules, interface, and the concept of play that it deploys. Espen Aarseth argues that, although games certainly have plots, characters, and aspects of traditional narratives, these aspects are incidental to gameplay. For example, Aarseth is critical of the widespread attention that narrativists have given to the heroine of the game Tomb Raider, saying that "the dimensions of Lara Croft's body, already analyzed to death by film theorists, are irrelevant to me as a player, because a different-looking body would not make me play differently... When I play, I don't even see her body, but see through it and past it." Ludologists reject traditional theories of art because they claim the artistic and socially relevant qualities of a video game, are primarily determined by the underlying set of rules, demands, and expectations imposed on the player.

While many games rely on emergent principles, video games commonly present simulated story worlds where emergent behavior occurs within the context of the game. The term "emergent narrative" has been used to describe how, in a simulated environment, storyline can be created simply by "what happens to the player." However, emergent behavior is not limited to sophisticated games. In general, any place where event-driven instructions occur for AI in a game, emergent behavior will exist. For instance, take a racing game in which cars are programmed to avoid crashing, and they encounter an obstacle in the track: the cars might then maneuver to avoid the obstacle causing the cars behind them to slow or maneuver to accommodate the cars in front of them and the obstacle. The programmer never wrote code to specifically create a traffic jam, yet one now exists in the game.

=== Intellectual property for video games ===
Most commonly, video games are protected by copyright, though both patents and trademarks have been used as well.

Though local copyright regulations vary to the degree of protection, video games qualify as copyrighted visual-audio works, and enjoy cross-country protection under the Berne Convention. This typically only applies to the underlying code, as well as to the artistic aspects of the game such as its writing, art assets, and music. Gameplay itself is generally not considered copyrightable; in the United States among other countries, video games are considered to fall into the idea–expression distinction in that it is how the game is presented and expressed to the player that can be copyrighted, but not the underlying principles of the game.

Because gameplay is normally ineligible for copyright, gameplay ideas in popular games are often replicated and built upon in other games. At times, this repurposing of gameplay can be seen as beneficial and a fundamental part of how the industry has grown by building on the ideas of others. For example Doom (1993) and Grand Theft Auto III (2001) introduced gameplay that created popular new game genres, the first-person shooter and the Grand Theft Auto clone, respectively, in the few years after their release. However, at times and more frequently at the onset of the industry, developers would intentionally create video game clones of successful games and game hardware with few changes, which led to the flooded arcade and dedicated home console market around 1978. Cloning is also a major issue with countries that do not have strong intellectual property protection laws, such as within China. The lax oversight by China's government and the difficulty for foreign companies to take Chinese entities to court had enabled China to support a large grey market of cloned hardware and software systems. The industry remains challenged to distinguish between creating new games based on refinements of past successful games to create a new type of gameplay, and intentionally creating a clone of a game that may simply swap out art assets.

== Industry ==
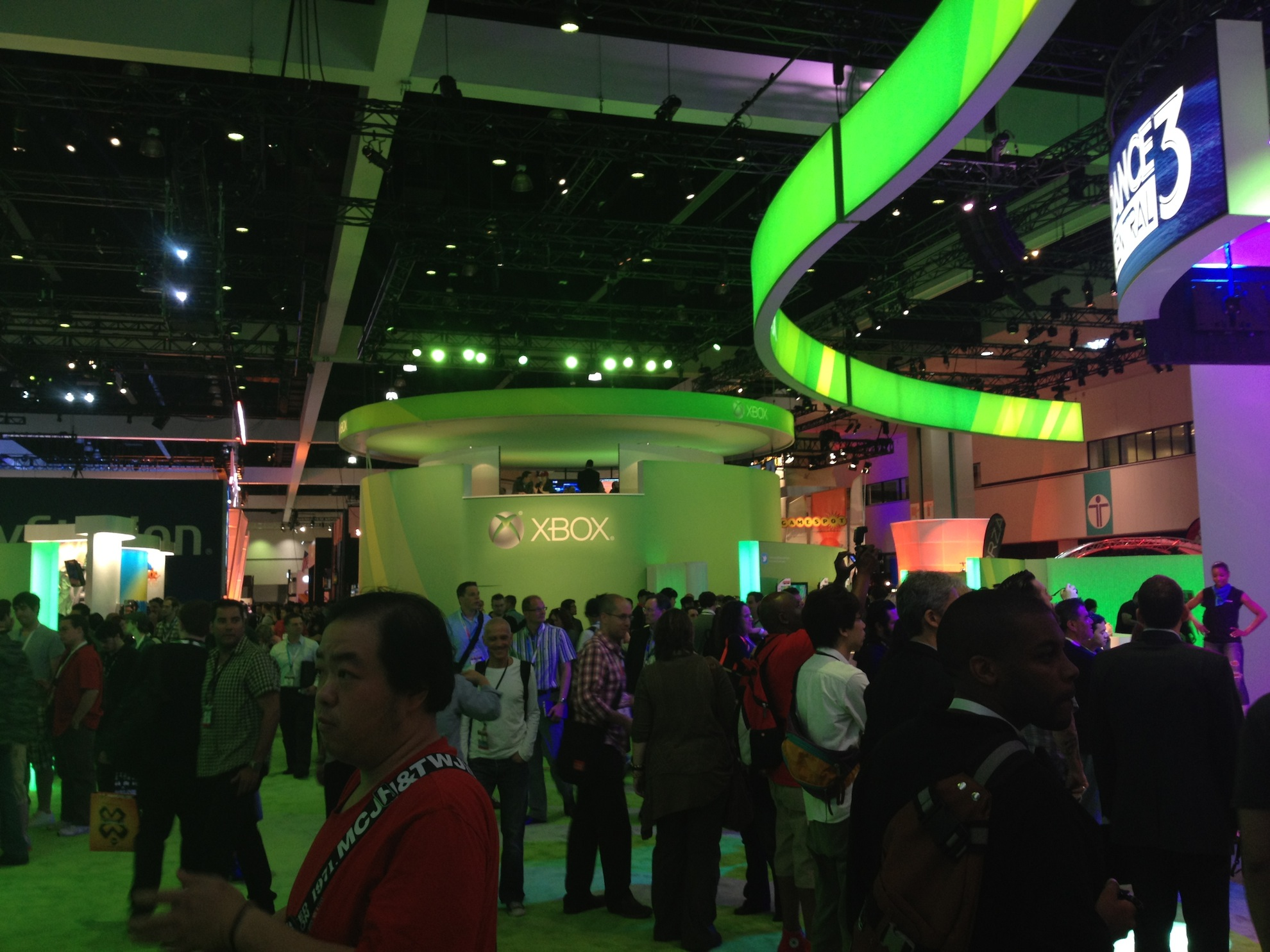
E3 was one of the typical trade show events of the video game industry.

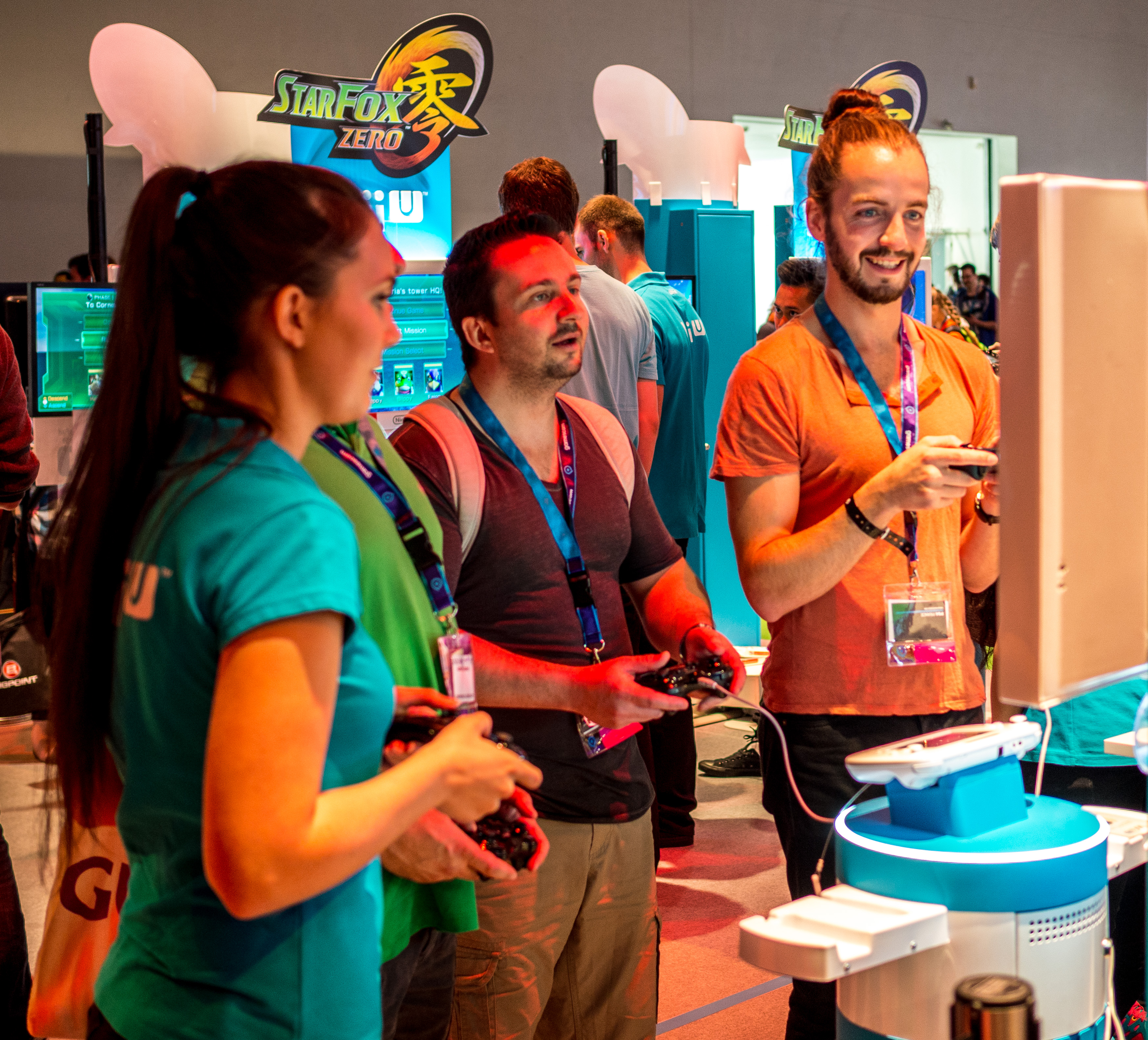
Attendees at Gamescom 2015 playing a video game

=== History ===
The early history of the video game industry, following the first game hardware releases and through 1983, had little structure. Video games quickly took off during the golden age of arcade video games from the late 1970s to early 1980s, but the newfound industry was mainly composed of game developers with little business experience. This led to numerous companies forming simply to create clones of popular games to try to capitalize on the market. Due to loss of publishing control and oversaturation of the market, the North American home video game market crashed in 1983, dropping from revenues of around $3 billion in 1983 to $100 million by 1985. Many of the North American companies created in the prior years closed down. Japan's growing game industry was briefly shocked by this crash but had sufficient longevity to withstand the short-term effects, and Nintendo helped to revitalize the industry with the release of the Nintendo Entertainment System in North America in 1985. Along with it, Nintendo established a number of core industrial practices to prevent unlicensed game development and control game distribution on their platform, methods that continue to be used by console manufacturers today.

The industry remained more conservative following the 1983 crash, forming around the concept of publisher-developer dichotomies, and by the 2000s, leading to the industry centralizing around low-risk, triple-A games and studios with large development budgets of at least $10 million or more. The advent of the Internet brought digital distribution as a viable means to distribute games, and contributed to the growth of more riskier, experimental independent game development as an alternative to triple-A games in the late 2000s and which has continued to grow as a significant portion of the video game industry.

=== Industry roles ===
Video games have a large network effect that draw on many different sectors that tie into the larger video game industry. While video game developers are a significant portion of the industry, other key participants in the market include:

- Publishers: Companies generally that oversee bringing the game from the developer to market. This often includes performing the marketing, public relations, and advertising of the game. Publishers frequently pay the developers ahead of time to make their games and will be involved in critical decisions about the direction of the game's progress, and then pay the developers additional royalties or bonuses based on sales performances. Other smaller, boutique publishers may simply offer to perform the publishing of a game for a small fee and a portion of the sales, and otherwise leave the developer with the creative freedom to proceed. A range of other publisher-developer relationships exist between these points.
- Distributors: Publishers often are able to produce their own game media and take the role of distributor, but there are also third-party distributors that can mass-produce game media and distribute to retailers. Digital storefronts like Steam and the iOS App Store also serve as distributors and retailers in the digital space.
- Retailers: Physical storefronts, which include large online retailers, department and electronic stores, and specialty video game stores, sell games, consoles, and other accessories to consumers. This has also including a trade-in market in certain regions, allowing players to turn in used games for partial refunds or credit towards other games. However, with the uprising of digital marketplaces and e-commerce revolution, retailers have been performing worse than in the past.
- Hardware manufacturers: The video game console manufacturers produce console hardware, often through a value chain system that include numerous component suppliers and contract manufacturer that assemble the consoles. Further, these console manufacturers typically require a license to develop for their platform and may control the production of some games, such as Nintendo does with the use of game cartridges for its systems. In exchange, the manufacturers may help promote games for their system and may seek console exclusivity for certain games. For games on personal computers, a number of manufacturers are devoted to high-performance "gaming computer" hardware, particularly in the graphics card area; several of the same companies overlap with component supplies for consoles. A range of third-party manufacturers also exist to provide equipment and gear for consoles post-sale, such as additional controllers for console or carrying cases and gear for handheld devices.
- Journalism: While journalism around video games used to be primarily print-based, and focused more on post-release reviews and gameplay strategy, the Internet has brought a more proactive press that use web journalism, covering games in the months prior to release as well as beyond, helping to build excitement for games ahead of release.
- Influencers: With the rising importance of social media, video game companies have found that the opinions of influencers using streaming media to play through their games has had a significant impact on game sales, and have turned to use influencers alongside traditional journalism as a means to build up attention to their game before release.
- Esports: Esports is a major function of several multiplayer games with numerous professional leagues established since the 2000s, with large viewership numbers, particularly out of southeast Asia since the 2010s.
- Trade and advocacy groups: Trade groups like the Entertainment Software Association were established to provide a common voice for the industry in response to governmental and other advocacy concerns. They frequently set up the major trade events and conventions for the industry such as E3.
- Gamers: Proactive hobbyists who are players and consumers of video games. While their representation in the industry is primarily seen through game sales, many companies follow gamers' comments on social media or on user reviews and engage with them to work to improve their products in addition to other feedback from other parts of the industry. Demographics of the larger player community also impact parts of the market; while once dominated by younger men, the market shifted in the mid-2010s towards women and older players who generally preferred mobile and causal games, leading to further growth in those sectors.

=== Major regional markets ===
The industry itself grew out from both the United States and Japan in the 1970s and 1980s before having a larger worldwide contribution. Today, the video game industry is predominantly led by major companies in North America (primarily the United States and Canada), Europe, and southeast Asia including Japan, South Korea, and China. Hardware production remains an area dominated by Asian companies either directly involved in hardware design or part of the production process, but digital distribution and indie game development of the late 2000s has allowed game developers to flourish nearly anywhere and diversify the field.

=== Game sales ===
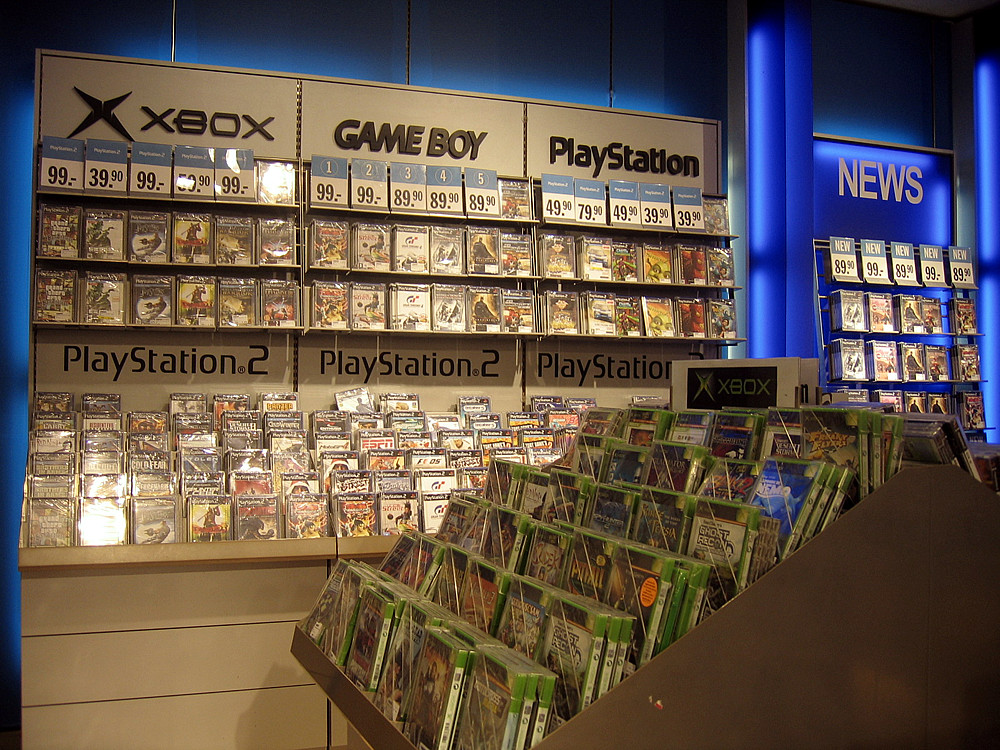
A retail display in Switzerland with a large selection of games for platforms popular in the early 2000s

According to the market research firm Newzoo, the global video game industry drew estimated revenues of over $159 billion in 2020. Mobile games accounted for the bulk of this, with a 48% share of the market, followed by console games at 28% and personal computer games at 23%.

Sales of different types of games vary widely between countries due to local preferences. Japanese consumers tend to purchase much more handheld games than console games and especially PC games, with a strong preference for games catering to local tastes. Another key difference is that, though having declined in the West, arcade games remain an important sector of the Japanese gaming industry. In South Korea, computer games are generally preferred over console games, especially MMORPG games and real-time strategy games. Computer games are also popular in China.

== Effects on society ==
=== Culture ===
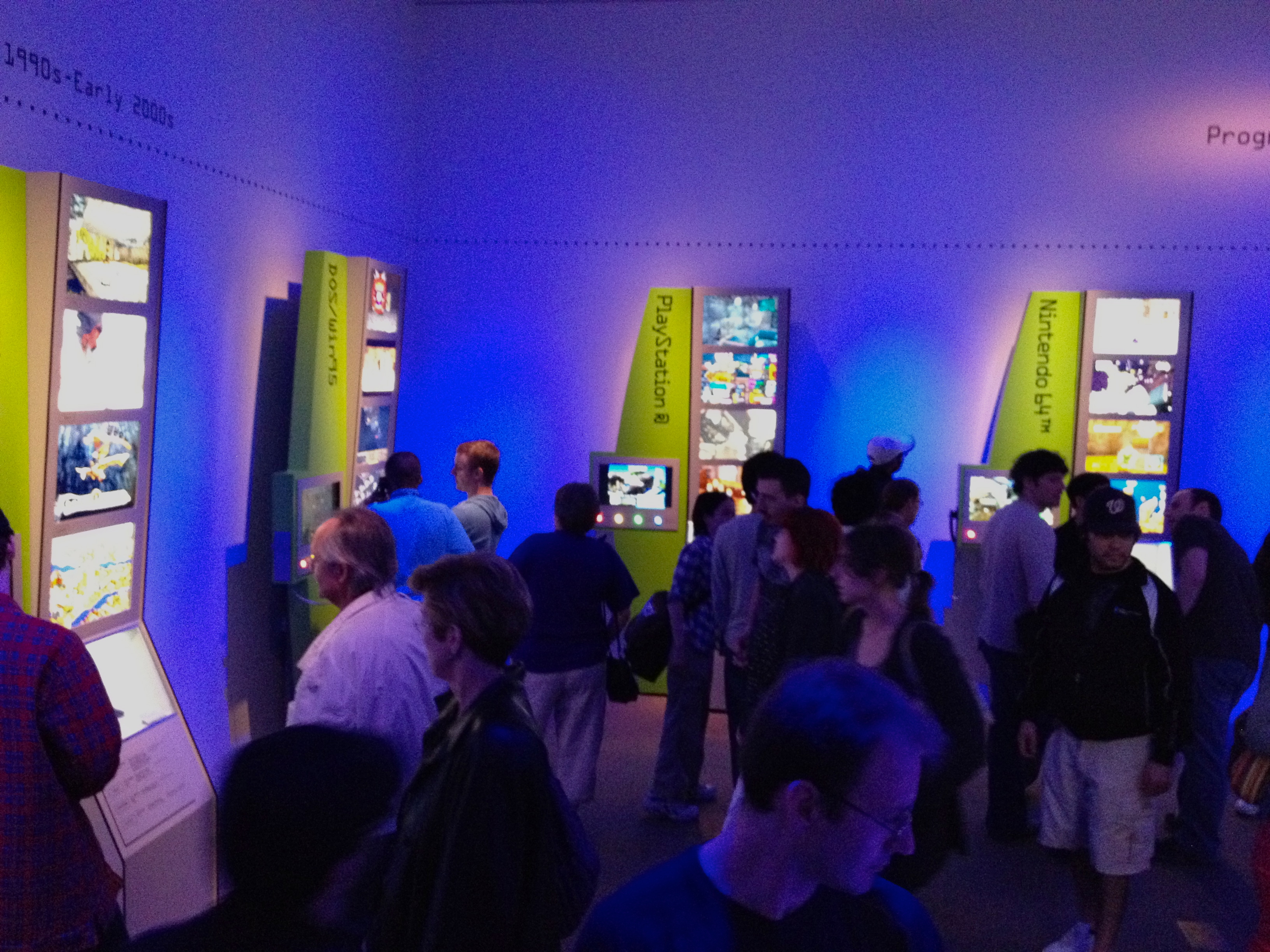
The Art of Video Games exhibit at the Smithsonian American Art Museum in 2012

Video game culture is a worldwide new media subculture formed around video games and game playing. As computer and video games have increased in popularity over time, they have had a significant influence on popular culture. Video game culture has also evolved over time hand in hand with internet culture as well as the increasing popularity of mobile games. Many people who play video games identify as gamers, which can mean anything from someone who enjoys games to someone who is passionate about it. As video games become more social with multiplayer and online capability, gamers find themselves in growing social networks. Gaming can both be entertainment as well as competition, as a new trend known as electronic sports is becoming more widely accepted. In the 2010s, video games and discussions of video game trends and topics can be seen in social media, politics, television, film and music. The COVID-19 pandemic during 2020–2021 gave further visibility to video games as a pastime to enjoy with friends and family online as a means of social distancing.

=== Art ===
Since the mid-2000s there has been debate whether video games qualify as art, primarily as the form's interactivity interfered with the artistic intent of the work and that they are designed for commercial appeal. A significant debate on the matter came after film critic Roger Ebert published an essay "Video Games can never be art", which challenged the industry to prove him and other critics wrong. The view that video games were an art form was cemented in 2011 when the U.S. Supreme Court ruled in the landmark case Brown v. Entertainment Merchants Association that video games were a protected form of speech with artistic merit. Since then, video game developers have come to use the form more for artistic expression, including the development of art games, and the cultural heritage of video games as works of arts, beyond their technical capabilities, have been part of major museum exhibits, including The Art of Video Games at the Smithsonian American Art Museum and toured at other museums from 2012 to 2016.

Video games will inspire sequels and other video games within the same franchise, but also have influenced works outside of the video game medium. Numerous television shows (both animated and live-action), films, comics and novels have been created based on existing video game franchises. Because video games are an interactive medium there has been trouble in converting them to these passive forms of media, and typically such works have been critically panned or treated as children's media. For example, until 2019, no video game film had ever been received a "Fresh" rating on Rotten Tomatoes, but the releases of Detective Pikachu (2019) and Sonic the Hedgehog (2020), both receiving "Fresh" ratings, shows signs of the film industry having found an approach to adapt video games for the large screen. That said, some early video game-based films have been highly successful at the box office, such as 1995's Mortal Kombat and 2001's Lara Croft: Tomb Raider.

More recently since the 2000s, there has also become a larger appreciation of video game music, which ranges from chiptunes composed for limited sound-output devices on early computers and consoles, to fully-scored compositions for most modern games. Such music has frequently served as a platform for covers and remixes, and concerts featuring video game soundtracks performed by bands or orchestras, such as Video Games Live, have also become popular. Video games also frequently incorporate licensed music, particularly in the area of rhythm games, furthering the depth of which video games and music can work together.

Further, video games can serve as a virtual environment under full control of a producer to create new works. With the capability to render 3D actors and settings in real-time, a new type of work machinima (short for "machine cinema") grew out from using video game engines to craft narratives. As video game engines gain higher fidelity, they have also become part of the tools used in more traditional filmmaking. Unreal Engine has been used as a backbone by Industrial Light & Magic for their StageCraft technology for shows like The Mandalorian.

Separately, video games are also frequently used as part of the promotion and marketing for other media, such as for films, anime, and comics. However, these licensed games in the 1990s and 2000s often had a reputation for poor quality, developed without any input from the intellectual property rights owners, and several of them are considered among lists of games with notably negative reception, such as Superman 64. More recently, with these licensed games being developed by triple-A studios or through studios directly connected to the licensed property owner, there has been a significant improvement in the quality of these games, with an early trendsetting example of Batman: Arkham Asylum.

=== Beneficial uses ===
Besides their entertainment value, appropriately-designed video games have been seen to provide value in education across several ages and comprehension levels. Learning principles found in video games have been identified as possible techniques with which to reform the U.S. education system. It has been noticed that gamers adopt an attitude while playing that is of such high concentration, they do not realize they are learning, and that if the same attitude could be adopted at school, education would enjoy significant benefits. Students are found to be "learning by doing" while playing video games while fostering creative thinking. Incorporating games in the teaching process is one possible way to utilize technology in the classroom to increase student engagement.

Video games are also believed to be beneficial to the mind and body. It has been shown that action video game players have better hand–eye coordination and visuo-motor skills, such as their resistance to distraction, their sensitivity to information in the peripheral vision and their ability to count briefly presented objects, than nonplayers. Researchers found that such enhanced abilities could be acquired by training with action games, involving challenges that switch attention between different locations, but not with games requiring concentration on single objects. The experience of video gaming is associated with better cognitive function, specifically in terms of visual attention and short-term memory, reaction time, and working memory. A 2018 systematic review found evidence that video gaming training had positive effects on cognitive and emotional skills in the adult population, especially with young adults. Video games also appear to enhance the functioning of the prefrontal cortex, which is involved in higher-order cognitive processes like decision-making, attention, and task-switching. A 2019 systematic review also added support for the claim that video games are beneficial to the brain, although the beneficial effects of video gaming on the brain differed by video games types.

How can video games boost your mental health? – Max Birk (Eindhoven University of Technology)

Organizers of video gaming events, such as the organizers of the D-Lux video game festival in Dumfries, Scotland, have emphasized the positive aspects video games can have on mental health. Organizers, mental health workers and mental health nurses at the event emphasized the relationships and friendships that can be built around video games and how playing games can help people learn about others as a precursor to discussing the person's mental health. A study in 2020 from Oxford University also suggested that playing video games can be a benefit to a person's mental health. The report of 3,274 gamers, all over the age of 18, focused on the games Animal Crossing: New Horizons and Plants vs Zombies: Battle for Neighborville and used actual play-time data. The report found that those that played more games tended to report greater "wellbeing". Also in 2020, computer science professor Regan Mandryk of the University of Saskatchewan said her research also showed that video games can have health benefits such as reducing stress and improving mental health. The university's research studied all age groups – "from pre-literate children through to older adults living in long term care homes" – with a main focus on 18 to 55-year-olds.

A study of gamers attitudes towards gaming which was reported about in 2018 found that millennials use video games as a key strategy for coping with stress. In the study of 1,000 gamers, 55% said that it "helps them to unwind and relieve stress ... and half said they see the value in gaming as a method of escapism to help them deal with daily work pressures".

=== Controversies ===
The compulsion loop for video games is believed to trigger dopamine release that can encourage addictive behavior.

Video games have caused controversy since the 1970s. Parents and children's advocates regularly raise concerns that violent video games can influence young players into performing those violent acts in real life, and events such as the Columbine High School massacre in 1999 in which some claimed the perpetrators specifically alluded to using video games to plot out their attack, raised further fears. Medical experts and mental health professionals have also raised concerned that video games may be addictive, and the World Health Organization has included "gaming disorder" in the 11th revision of its International Statistical Classification of Diseases. Other health experts, including the American Psychiatric Association, have stated that there is insufficient evidence that video games can create violent tendencies or lead to addictive behavior, though agree that video games typically use a compulsion loop in their core design that can create dopamine that can help reinforce the desire to continue to play through that compulsion loop and potentially lead into violent or addictive behavior. There has been interviews on teenagers about how video games affected their health and academic when playing video games, especially the amount of sleep they get. Teens who report playing video games too much stand out for thinking video games have hurt their sleep and school performance. Even with case law establishing that video games qualify as a protected art form, there has been pressure on the video game industry to keep their products in check to avoid over-excessive violence particularly for games aimed at younger children. The potential addictive behavior around games, coupled with increased used of post-sale monetization of video games, has also raised concern among parents, advocates, and government officials about gambling tendencies that may come from video games, such as controversy around the use of loot boxes in many high-profile games.

Numerous other controversies around video games and its industry have arisen over the years, among the more notable incidents include the 1993 United States Congressional hearings on violent games like Mortal Kombat which led to the formation of the ESRB ratings system, numerous legal actions taken by attorney Jack Thompson over violent games such as Grand Theft Auto III and Manhunt from 2003 to 2007, the outrage over the "No Russian" level from Call of Duty: Modern Warfare 2 in 2009 which allowed the player to shoot a number of innocent non-player characters at an airport, and the Gamergate harassment campaign in 2014 that highlighted misogyny from a portion of the player demographic. The industry as a whole has also dealt with issues related to gender, racial, and LGBTQ+ discrimination and mischaracterization of these minority groups in video games. A further issue in the industry is related to working conditions, as development studios and publishers frequently use "crunch time", required extended working hours, in the weeks and months ahead of a game's release to assure on-time delivery.

== Collecting and preservation ==
Players of video games often maintain collections of games. More recently there has been interest in retro gaming, focusing on games from the first decades. Games in retail packaging in good shape have become collector's items for the early days of the industry, with some rare publications having gone for over US$100,000 as of 2020. Separately, there is also concern about the preservation of video games, as both game media and the hardware to play them degrade over time. Further, many of the game developers and publishers from the first decades no longer exist, so records of their games have disappeared. Archivists and preservations have worked within the scope of copyright law to save these games as part of the cultural history of the industry.

One problem regarding video game preservation is legality. Many retro games with no official sustained method of playability are kept alive via emulation. This can, however, be illegal. As for modern live-service games, a company can revoke licenses, shut down servers, or otherwise take actions that result in the game becoming unplayable. Movements such as “Stop Killing Games” attempt to reform video game law to make emulation of retro games legal, as well as prevent companies from shutting down live-service games. It has achieved mixed results, with reform being considered in California.

There are many video game museums around the world, including the National Videogame Museum in Frisco, Texas, which serves as the largest museum wholly dedicated to the display and preservation of the industry's most important artifacts. Europe hosts video game museums such as the Computer Games Museum in Berlin and the Museum of Soviet Arcade Machines in Moscow and Saint-Petersburg. The Museum of Art and Digital Entertainment in Oakland, California is a dedicated video game museum focusing on playable exhibits of console and computer games. The Video Game Museum of Rome is also dedicated to preserving video games and their history. The International Center for the History of Electronic Games at The Strong in Rochester, New York contains one of the largest collections of electronic games and game-related historical materials in the world, including a 5,000-square-foot (460 m^{2}) exhibit which allows guests to play their way through the history of video games. The Smithsonian Institution in Washington, DC has three video games on permanent display: Pac-Man, Dragon's Lair, and Pong.

The Museum of Modern Art has added a total of 20 video games and one video game console to its permanent Architecture and Design Collection since 2012. In 2012, the Smithsonian American Art Museum ran an exhibition on "The Art of Video Games". However, the reviews of the exhibit were mixed, including questioning whether video games belong in an art museum.

== See also ==
- Lists of video games
- List of accessories to video games by system
- Outline of video games
