= Endgame: Syria =

2012 video game

- Developer: GameTheNews
- Engine: GameMaker:Studio
- Platforms: HTML5, Android
- Release: 12 December 2012 (Android, HTML5)
- Genre: Trading card game newsgame
- Mode: Single-player

Endgame: Syria is a trading card based newsgame developed by GameTheNews.net, a project looking to turn news into games. It launched on the 12 December 2012 and claimed to be the first ever attempt to cover an ongoing conflict in the form of a video game. It attracted a range of responses from the positive to critical. The game places the player in the role of coordinating the rebel side of the Syrian Civil War, where they have to decide the political and military choices faced in resolving the conflict. An iOS version was planned, but cancelled due to conflicts with Apple's developer rules concerning its subject matter.

== Gameplay ==
The game is a turn-based card game, in which each turn is divided into a political and military phase. Each of these two phases can positive or negatively affect the support level of either of two factions. The game ends when either one faction loses all support or both factions agree to a peace deal.

== iOS version controversy and aftermath ==
A planned iOS version of the game was rejected by Apple's App Store, citing App Store guidelines forbidding games that “solely target a specific race, culture, a real government or corporation, or any other real entity”. This sparked debate over both the rules of the App Store and the appropriateness of the form in covering war.

Russia Today featured a report on Apple's refusal to publish the game, agreeing with the decision citing the game as "unethical" and "only on one side" as there is only an ability to play as the rebels and not as the Syrian Government. They also considered it to be factually inaccurate, as the game features Russia as supporting the government despite "statements coming from the foreign ministry that Russia does not take any side in this conflict."

Three separate submissions were made to Apple, in an attempt to get the game passed, each time removing a wider range of things that might be considered a reference to real groups or people. Ultimately, Apple refused to allow Endgame: Syria onto the App Store for simply mentioning the country of Syria itself, resulting in the cancellation of the iOS version.

=== Alternate reskins ===
Hemmings Play Company, a radical reskin of the game

Following the failure to get the iOS version of Endgame: Syria authorized for release, GameTheNews cancelled such version and repurposed it as a new game, Endgame: Eurasia. Tomas Rawlings, the game's lead designer, expressed disappointment with this decision, as it would prevent the game from achieving its intended educational purpose. He said, "We've come to the end of three rejections and one appeal and the only way we've been able to get Endgame: Syria out on iOS was to remove all references to the real world and sadly that changes it from a 'newsgame' into just a 'game'."

In the wake of the controversial cancellation of the iOS version, GameTheNews' parent company Auroch Digital then used the engine of Endgame: Syria to create a new game for Shakespeare's Globe, titled Hemmings' Play Company. Rawlings lauded the reskin, remarking that "these bold adaptations of our existing titles show how the dynamics of a game should not be confused with its subject matter. If the core functionally is robust and game play intuitive, they can become the canvass for a variety of great projects."
