= 1000 Days of Syria =

2014 interactive fiction newsgame

- Developer: Mitch Swenson
- Platform: Web browser
- Release: WW: 2014
- Genres: Education; Interactive fiction
- Mode: Single-player

1000 Days of Syria is an interactive fiction newsgame centered on the first 1,000 days of the Syrian civil war. In the game, the player chooses the role of one of three characters, each of which have three different endings dependent on the choices the player makes throughout the game. It was created in 2014 by Mitch Swenson following his experiences in the conflict to inform more people of it. The game received a positive response from journalists.

== Gameplay and plot ==
1000 Days of Syria is an interactive fiction newsgame that takes place in the Syrian civil war, focusing on the first 1,000 days of the conflict. The player is able to choose from one of three different characters to take the role of. These characters are a mother of two living in the town of Daraa, a young rebel living in Aleppo, and an American journalist based in Beirut. The route of the game and its story is determined by the choices the player makes, with the player having the option to attempt to leave Syria or stay in the country. Furthermore, the game is presented entirely with text, with no additional media present. Each character has three different endings, and the ending achieved is determined by the player's actions. Occasionally, the stories of the characters may intersect with each other.

== Development and release ==
In September 2013, journalist Mitch Swenson and his colleagues traveled from Turkey to Northern Syria during the Syrian civil war, where he traveled throughout the country with the Sunni Islamist rebel group Suqour al-Sham Brigades for ten days alongside David Axe. Swenson's group collaborated with the rebels, with the rebels providing the group transportation in exchange for food and fuel. Swenson described what he experienced as an "all-purveying, all-consuming, merciless, heart-eating, machine of war". Upon leaving the country in October and arriving in New York, Swenson criticized the lack of public attention to the war, believing that "nine times as many people clicked on links to do with Miley Cyrus than the war". After writing about his experiences himself, he searched for new ways to communicate his experiences in Syria and bring them more to public attention, where he settled on creating a browser game. Aiming to be an educational experience, Swenson wrote in the game's about page that, under certain circumstances of what is considered a "game", 1000 Days of Syria should instead be considered "interactive education" rather than a game. Furthermore, he created the game entirely with text and no images, believing the omission of visuals to "better to illuminate the gravity & humanity in Syria." The game was released in 2014, and is playable on an independent website.

== Reception ==
Citing increasing tensions in the Middle East at the time, Jonathan Brown of Daily Dot advised people play the game in order to rejuvenate awareness in the region, including the Syrian civil war as well as the conflict in Israel and Palestine. Zach Goldhammer of The Atlantic praised the game, commenting on the lack of sensational violence that other videogames, such as Call of Duty: Modern Warfare 2 (2009), used to depict war.

The game was an official selection of the 2014 Indie Prize Showcase and Meaningful Play Conference.
