= Newsgame =

Video game genre

Newsgames are a genre of video games that attempt to apply journalistic principles to their gameplay. Newsgames can provide context to complex situations which might be hard to explain without experiencing the situation firsthand. According to newsgame developers Ian Bogost, Simone Ferrari and Bobby Schweizer, newsgames are a "body of work produced at the intersection of video games and journalism." Journalists use newsgames to expand on stories so the audience can learn more about the information in an immersive way.

Video games in the news game genre are those that are based on real-world ideas, problems, and events. They resemble political cartoons in the context of video games and aim to provide players a fictitious experience based on actual events. According to game studies scholar Miguel Sicart, news games are a means of participating in public discourse, utilizing the unique affordances of the medium to engage players in important social and political issues.

== History ==
The format started with the game September 12 by Gonzalo Frasca, published in 2003. In September 12, the player is positioned in a bomber in the sky, with its sights set on a village in the Middle East. The player must find and kill a terrorist within the village, which is heavily populated with civilians. The player needs to decide when to fire on the village, with the goal of causing as little collateral damage, as too much destruction may cause other civilians to become terrorists.

== Examples ==
- The Voter Suppression Trail is a simulation game that highlights issues in the American voting system.
- The Good, The Bad and The Accountant features players as the general manager of a city having to juggle corruption
- Syrian Journey puts players in the role of a Syrian refugee who just sold all of their possessions
- NarcoGuerra, a game based on the war on drugs and Mexican drug War, was released in June 2013.
- Endgame:Syria, a game exploring the Syrian civil war that started in March 2011, which was refused by Apple's App Store and created a debate around the role of games, news and their distribution as a result
- Sock and Awe, a game where the player throws shoes at George W. Bush
- Madrid, a game about memorializing the Madrid bombings
- September 12th, a game about civilian casualties in the war on terror
- Darfur is Dying, a game about the refugee crisis in Darfur
- Bacteria Salad, a game about the spinach E. coli contamination of 2006
- Jogo da Máfia, a Brazilian game that explains how globalized Mafia works
- Filosofighters, a journalistic game that explains basic philosophy concepts
- Snowden Run 3D, a game based on the events surrounding NSA leaker Edward Snowden
- 1000 Days of Syria, a hypertext-based historical fiction game timelining the first 1000 days of the Syrian conflict
- Archanoid, an arcade game based on Breakout (Arkanoid) which describes the destruction of over 500 historical buildings in Moscow
- HeartSaver: An Experimental News Game, April 2013, GEN Editors' Lab Hackathon, by Al Shaw, Sisi Wei and Amanda Zamora
- Budget Hero, a "policy flight simulator"
- JFK Reloaded, a video game that simulates the assassination of President John F. Kennedy
- Pule o Muro (Jump over the Wall, loosely translated) is a newsgame based on true events that takes place in communist Berlin during the early 1970s. The game challenges the player to attempt an escape to the west side of Germany by crossing the Berlin Wall.

== See also ==
- Immersive journalism
