= NarcoGuerra =

2013 video game

- Developer: GameTheNews
- Engine: Unity
- Platforms: Windows, macOS, Android, iOS
- Release: June 2013
- Genres: Strategy, newsgame
- Mode: Single-player

NarcoGuerra, Spanish for "DrugWar", is a strategy newsgame developed by GameTheNews.net. It was released in June 2013 for Android, PC, Mac, iPhone, iPod Touch and iPad.

The game criticises the ongoing war on drugs and more specifically the Mexican drug war which the developer claims ″...is a challenging and tactical newsgame that puts you on the frontline of one of the most dangerous conflicts ever; the war on drugs. NarcoGuerra looks at the ongoing conflict from the perspective of the Mexican authorities trying to stamp out the drug trade within that embattled country.″

== Gameplay ==
Game main screen

NarcoGuerra is a turn-based strategy game with Risk like elements that takes place over a map of Mexico. The map is divided into a number of regions, most consisting of a single state, which are either controlled by the police or one of the cartels. Each region has a number of units stationed in it, the more units the easier it is to hold, and attack from. Some regions also bestow bonuses when held such as increased income or defense. Each turn is split between two main phases, the Support Phase and Attack Phase. The player wins when they have removed all other opponents from the game. The game is lost if they lose all their regions to the opposing sides. There are 3 different game modes; Story, Skirmish and Local Multiplayer. Skirmish mode is unlocked once the player has completed Story mode.

=== Story Mode ===
In Story mode the player takes on the position of Mexico's Chief of Police with the main aim of tackling the country's drug problems by destroying the various cartels. The game aims to show the link between the street price of drugs and policing, so as the policing succeeds, it constricts the supply of drugs and pushes the price up. As the price goes up, new cartels enter the market as it becomes more profitable.

At the beginning of the player's turn, there is a chance of a randomized event occurring. Displayed as 'Activity Reports', these events provide insight into the actual situation in Mexico as well as missions for the player to achieve for increased income.

==== Support Phase ====
During the Support Phase, the player will spend their budget on distributing units over the parts of the map they control to prepare for the following Attack Phase. 4 Abilities are available to the player; Hire Officer (purchase units), Redeploy (move units between controlled neighbouring regions), Intel (reveal the number of units stationed in regions not bordering your own), and Internal Affairs (lowers corruption). 3 important values also appear on the main game screen; Budget, Corruption and Street Price.

The Police's income is a set amount per region held and is where the majority of their budget comes from. The cartels' income is based on the regions they hold and the current street price. The street price will rise as the cartels lose territory, with the drugs being harder to come by, and fall when the market is saturated.

Each turn, the Police's corruption rating will rise by a random amount. As this gets higher, there is an ever-increasing chance that units will defect to the other side. To compensate for this, the player must spend money on the "Internal Affairs" ability.

==== Attack Phase ====
A faction can attack from a controlled region to a neighbouring enemy region. Similar to Risk, the attacking occurs in bouts where the attacker matches 3 six-sided dice against the defender's two dice (each dice representing a unit). The two highest rolls from each side are compared and the highest roll wins (defenders win on a draw), the losing units are destroyed and this continues until either the attacker takes the region or runs out of troops to attack with. Consecutive attacks by the same faction on the same turn cost increasingly more, effectively limiting the number of attacks you can make per turn. If an attack is successful, the attacker may then decide how to redistribute the remaining units between the two regions.

==== Elections ====
Every five turns, there is an election during which the player is able to pledge money to one of the two candidates. 'Arturo Herrera' the pro-war candidate who is initially stronger in the polls, provides an attack bonus on winning. 'Miguel Moralas' intends to instigate legalization of the drugs market, the game's dynamic changes dramatically when he comes into power as the street price will consistently drop meaning the cartels can no longer make as much money from the drugs trade.

Elections screen

=== Skirmish Mode ===
Skirmish Mode is identical to Story Mode except that any game dynamics relating to the elections and street price are removed. This allows players to have a more balanced game without being so concerned with the economic/political factors the Story Mode is trying to draw attention to. This mode is locked until Story Mode has been completed at least once.

=== Multiplayer ===
This is a local multiplayer mode that allows players to take turns by passing a single device between them. As opposed to playing as the police players now play as different cartels. They no longer have to combat corruption and so the 'Internal Affairs' ability is replaced with 'Bribe', this allows a player to effectively buy off units from enemy territory that is anywhere on the map for an inflated price.

=== Newsgaming and educational aspects ===
The game has a number of devices it uses to inform the player about the current war on drugs.

- Each region has a blurb about how the area is effected by the ongoing war when it is selected.
- The Corruption dynamic is designed to emphasize the problems Mexico has with the player constantly having to spend money to keep their units faithful to the cause. "NarcoGuerra simulates this effect with a rising meter that shows the spread of corruption throughout your police force. If it gets too high, you'll start losing units as they defect to the cartels."
- The missions and events given to the player are based on real news articles and information gathered from a number of sources including the Transform Drug Policy Foundation.
- The AI of the cartels becomes more aggressive when they are in need of resources and will ignore the police if they do not interfere with their operations.
- The street price dynamic is key to the message of the game. By destroying the cartels and lowering the territory they control the street price naturally rises as illegal narcotics become more scarce and people are willing to pay a higher premium to acquire them, or take larger risks in supplying them. This results in the cartels being able to fight back harder and stronger whenever they are beaten back and a stalemate naturally arises.

== Development ==
NarcoGuerra is Game the News first release. Tomas Rawlings, the lead designer, said: "The game is the biggest newsgame we've created, which has taken a lot of time effort and expense".

"We've built a simulation based on our research about the reality of the War on Drugs, [the game shows] how corruption and street price ebb and flow with police actions."

The developers claim that basing the game on Risk was a deliberate attempt to draw attention to how one can not solve a social problem through militaristic means. "The gamer way to understand war is through games like Risk. You're presented with something that seems like a strategy game that you can charge ahead and win at. And of course, you find out it's a bit harder than you thought it was going to be. Because actually, it isn't a war on drugs. And that's the point."

== Reception ==
The reception was positive for the game. The Guardian stated: "Game the News is one of the more interesting indie game developers working at the moment" and ABC news reported "This gives users an idea of what the real drug war is like." GGSGamer considered it to be "an interesting, illuminating and – most importantly – fun game. I can honestly say I walked away with a new understanding of the conflict and an appreciation for the dire situation facing anyone charged with combating the cartels."
