= Checkers (video game) =

1952 puzzle video game

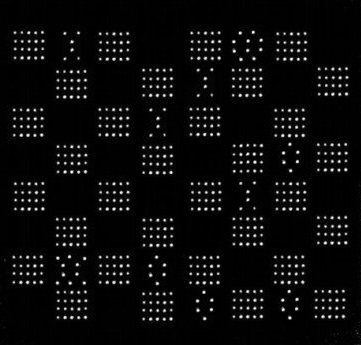
- Checkers, as it would have appeared on a Ferranti Mark 1
- Developer: Christopher Strachey
- Programmer: Christopher Strachey
- Platforms: Pilot ACE; Ferranti Mark 1
- Release: UK: July 1952
- Genre: Puzzle
- Mode: Single-player

Checkers, also called Draughts, is a 1952 video game developed by English computer scientist Christopher Strachey. It is one of the first computer programs in the early history of video games, possibly the first game to display visuals on an electronic screen, and the first game written for a general-purpose computer. It first became operational during the summer of that year on the Ferranti Mark 1 computer at the University of Manchester. In Checkers, the player competes against a rudimentary artificial intelligence in a simulation of the board game of the same name; the game ends when all of either player's pieces have been captured or obstructed by the opponent.

Checkers began development in early 1951 when Strachey joined the National Physical Laboratory, which had just succeeded in building a prototype computer called the Pilot ACE, based on Alan Turing's Automatic Computing Engine. To familiarize himself with programming on this machine, Strachey wrote a game inspired by the article A Theory of Chess and Noughts and Crosses, published in 1950. He was also influenced in his choice by Charles Babbage's analytical engine and proposals for chess and checkers games. Programming errors, however, prevented it from functioning correctly, and the prototype's memory was insufficient to run the game properly. In the spring of 1952, Strachey learned that the University of Manchester owned the Ferranti Mark 1, a computer more powerful than the ACE. He then went to the Computing Machine Laboratory in Manchester, where he met Turing. Encouraged by him, Strachey made numerous improvements to Checkers, which by July 1952 was running at a playable speed. Later that year at a conference in Toronto, Canada, Strachey described Checkers to Arthur Samuel, prompting him to develop his own version on the IBM 701.

== Gameplay ==
Checkers simulates a game of English draughts on a monochrome display. It uses a simple heuristic and calculates the next three to four moves; on each turn, it computes all possible positions to choose the strongest one. It also considers other parameters, such as the value of kings, which are assigned a value three times higher than that of a regular piece, while progress is displayed on a cathode-ray tube. Strachey modified two of the computer's screens, originally intended for monitoring the system's operations, to instead display a bitboard with the positions of pieces or kings. The white squares are numbered from one to 31, and the program uses three 32-bit variables to list the positions of pieces or kings for each color. Played matches are recorded by a teleprinter.

The player presses a button to start the game, which offers to flip a coin to decide which party will start. The player then provides this information to the computer using a switch and a button. The computer and the player alternate moves, with the computer recording its move on the teleprinter and the player making their move using a button, followed by another to confirm. One of the screens allows the computer to show the move the player has chosen before they confirm it, or to cancel it to select another move. The other screen displays the progress of the game.

When the game begins, the computer emits beeps as soon as it is ready to accept the player's move and provides pre-recorded responses based on the player's subsequent actions. For example, if the player takes too long to play, the computer displays on the screen, "You must play at once or resign."; if the player makes a mistake in handling, it displays "Kindly read the instructions and start the move again."; abnormal player behavior prompts "If you don't follow the instructions I can't play with you." or a sharp "I refuse to waste any more time. Go and play with a human being." The computer, also subject to errors, can occasionally output garbled messages. When the game is finished, it plays a sample of "God Save the King".

== Development ==
=== Background ===
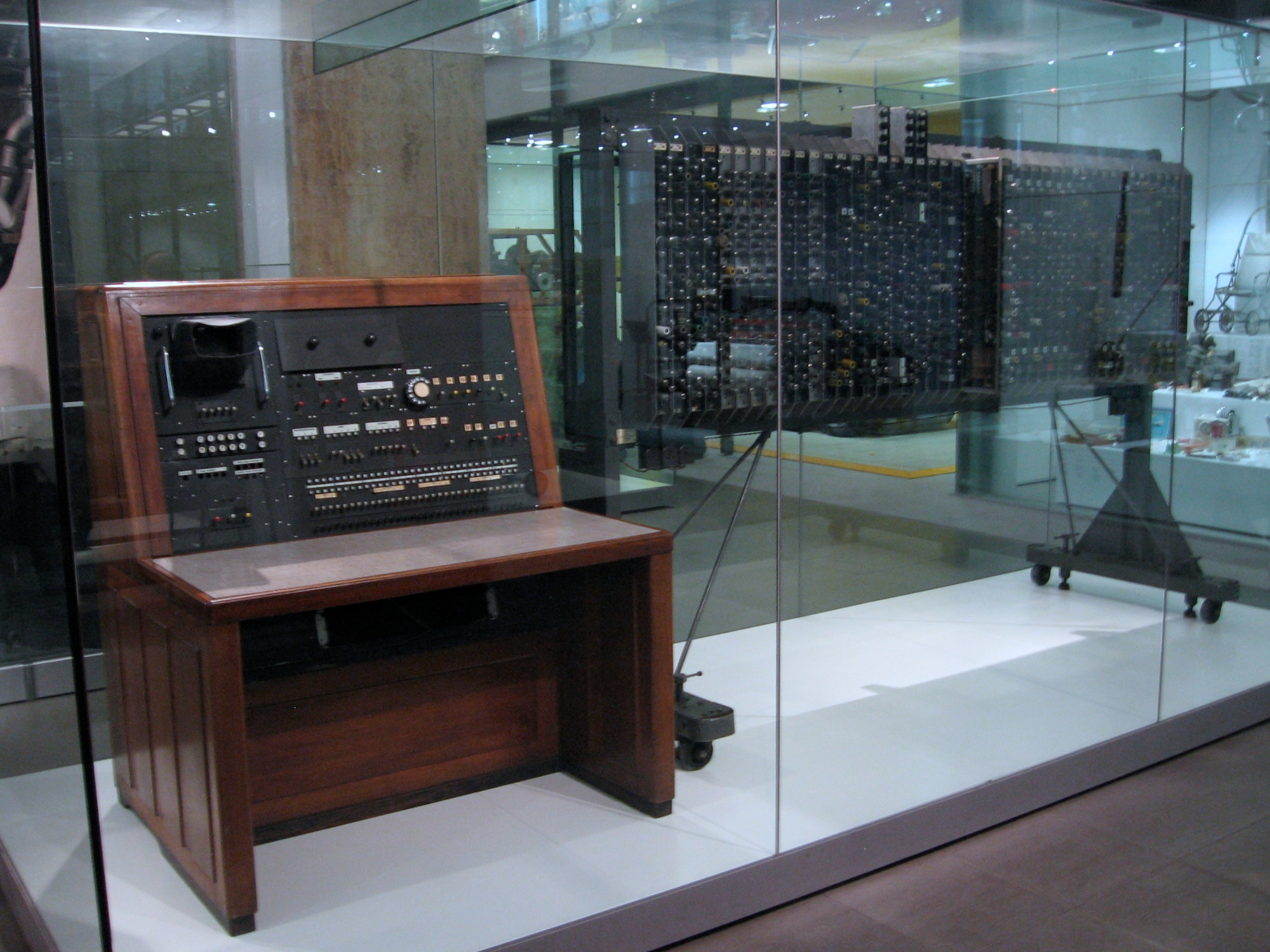
The Pilot ACE at the Science Museum in London

Christopher Strachey was an English computer scientist specialising in denotational semantics and who was one of the pioneers of programming languages. Born in 1916, he was the son of British cryptographer Oliver Strachey and Ray Strachey, an English writer and feminist politician. He studied at Gresham's School, King's College, Cambridge, and the University of Cambridge. Despite his family background, he did not stand out at King's and later worked on radars during World War II, then taught at Harrow. However, the concept of intelligent machines quickly caught his attention. In January 1951, a friend introduced him to Mike Woodger of the National Physical Laboratory (NPL), and he subsequently joined the laboratory. The NPL housed the prototype of the Automatic Computing Engine (ACE), designed and built by Alan Turing starting in 1945. The project was delayed for many months, however, due to technical, political, and economic reasons, and Turing abandoned the highly ambitious project in 1947. Thanks to Donald Davies, who worked at the NPL, the laboratory continued the work and eventually succeeded in building the Pilot ACE, a more compact version of the ACE concept, which began operating in May 1950.

In his spare time, Strachey developed a checkers game program to familiarize himself with programming on this machine, which he completed in February 1951. He was inspired by an article titled A Theory of Chess and Noughts and Crosses published in 1950 in Penguin Science News, written by NPL scientist Donald Davies. He was also influenced in his choice by Charles Babbage's analytical engine and proposals for chess and checkers games. Strachey compiled a preliminary version of the program in May 1951 at the NPL, and he tested it for the first time on July 30, 1951, on the Pilot ACE computer. Programming errors, however, prevented it from functioning correctly, and the prototype's memory was insufficient to run the game properly. Strachey also faced frequent component changes in the computer, which regularly rendered parts of his code obsolete.

=== Concept and creation ===
In the spring of 1951, Woodger informed Strachey that the Ferranti Mark I computer had just been installed at the University of Manchester, replacing the Manchester Mark I, from which it was derived. This computer had more memory than the Pilot ACE, which better suited the work Strachey wanted to undertake. In July, he traveled for the first time to the University of Manchester to explore the Ferranti computer and met Alan Turing, who was then the assistant director at the university's Computing Machine Laboratory. Strachey explained his ideas about creating a checkers game. He knew Turing to an extent, as they had both attended King's College, which allowed Strachey to obtain the Ferranti Mark I user manual which Turing had recently written, to port the game onto this computer. Turing was quite impressed by the game but suggested to Strachey that an interesting task would be to simulate the machine itself, in the same way as the selective analysis program developed for the EDSAC computer at the University of Cambridge. Convinced by this idea, the game was temporarily shelved.

Turing's encouragement was crucial for Strachey, who eventually managed to get the game running on the Ferranti Mark I. Turing appreciated Strachey, who had brought fresh ideas from King's College into the technical atmosphere of the Manchester laboratory, especially since they behaved similarly and shared the same sense of humor. In 1952, the two of them amused themselves by creating a program on the Mark I that wrote love letters with randomly generated content, using random numbers and prerecorded text fragments. Turing persuaded Strachey to create two audio programs—the first of their kind—that enabled the computer to play music, namely "In the Mood" by Glenn Miller and "Baa, Baa, Black Sheep".

Other laboratory members were initially amused to see Strachey eager to run his program on punched tape as they did not believe that a newcomer could succeed in running a complex program on their first attempt. After he corrected a few errors, however, the program worked, successfully playing a game of checkers followed by "God Save the King" through a loudspeaker. From that point on, Strachey gained a reputation as a "remarkable" developer. The final version's code was over 20 pages long and contained over 1,000 instructions, making it the longest program ever written for a computer at the time, although Strachey was unaware of this record. Strachey made numerous improvements and eventually completed the port of the game, which, by July 1952, could play a complete game of checkers at a manageable speed.

== Legacy ==
While earlier games such as Bertie the Brain ran on dedicated machines, Checkers was unique in that it ran on a general-purpose Turing-complete computer, enabling it to use one of the first electronic displays. It was the first such computer game to do so. Checkers was also one of the first games to incorporate a form of artificial intelligence; it was preceded only by Turochamp, a chess program designed by Turing in 1948 but never successfully run on a computer. Around the same time in 1952 as Checkers, the tic-tac-toe video game OXO was created by Alexander S. Douglas on the EDSAC. It is, however, disputed whether Checkers or OXO was the first to become functional and therefore be the first game to display visuals on an electronic screen. Checkers inspired Arthur Samuel, who discovered it at a conference organized the same year in Toronto, Canada, where Strachey described his game. Samuel then created a version of Checkers in 1952 on the IBM 701. He continued to improve its artificial intelligence in the following years, and in 1956, it would be showcased on television.

When Strachey wrote Checkers, he had envisioned a machine learning system alongside it. He designed a routine learning program and, following a discussion with Turing, hoped to implement it in a simulation of nim. Strachey would, however, miss the opportunity to be the first to present a functional computer program incorporating the machine learning concept. He was outpaced by Anthony Oettinger and his programs running on the EDSAC.

Checkers has been preserved and is kept at the Bodleian Library at the University of Oxford. Five versions of it exist, each with handwritten code around twenty pages long. Transcriptions of games played by Strachey during tests, recorded via a teleprinter, are also preserved. These printouts indicate that the game was primarily developed in June and July 1952, but an undated version was likely written before May 1951.

== Bibliography ==
- Andersen, Robin; Gray, Jonathan Alan (2008). Battleground: The Media. Greenwood Publishing Group. ISBN 978-0-313-34169-4.
- Baker, Kevin (2013). The Ultimate Guide to Classic Game Consoles. eBookIt. ISBN 978-1-4566-1708-0.
- Cawthorne, Nigel (2014). Alan Turing: The Enigma Man. Arcturus Publishing. ISBN 978-1-78428-042-0.
- Copeland, B. Jack; Turing, Alan Mathison (2004). The Essential Turing: Seminal Writings in Computing, Logic, Philosophy, Artificial Intelligence, and Artificial Life plus The Secrets of Enigma. Oxford/New York: Oxford University Press. ISBN 0-19-825079-7.
- Copeland, B. Jack (2012). Turing: Pioneer of the Information Age. Oxford/New York: Oxford University Press. ISBN 978-0-19-963979-3.
- Dillon, Roberto (2016). The Golden Age of Video Games: The Birth of a Multibillion Dollar Industry. CRC Press. ISBN 978-1-4398-7324-3.
- Donovan, Tristan (2010). Replay: The History of Video Games. East Sussex, England: Yellow Ant. ISBN 978-0-9565072-0-4.
- Hodges, Andrew (2015). Alan Turing (in French). Michel Lafon Publishing. ISBN 978-2-7499-2485-4.
- Kaplan, Arie (2013). The Biggest Names of Video Games. Lerner Publications. ISBN 978-1-4677-1253-8.
- Loguidice, Bill; Barton, Matt (2014). Vintage Game Consoles: An Inside Look At Apple, Atari, Commodore, Nintendo, and the Greatest Gaming Platforms of All Time. CRC Press. ISBN 978-0-415-85600-3.
- Moor, James H (2003). The Turing Test: The Elusive Standard of Artificial Intelligence. Dordrecht: Kluwer Academic. ISBN 978-1-4020-1205-1.
- Schaeffer, Jonathan (2008). One Jump Ahead: Computer Perfection at Checkers. Dordrecht: Springer. ISBN 978-0-387-76575-4.
- Turing, Dermot (2015). PROF: Alan Turing Decoded. The History Press. ISBN 978-1-84165-643-4.
- Wolf, Mark J. P (2007). The video Game Explosion: A History from PONG to Playstation and Beyond. Westport: Greenwood Publishing Group. ISBN 978-0-313-33868-7.
- Wood, Alix (2014). Video Game Designer. Powerkids Pr. ISBN 978-1-4777-6015-4.
