= Tennis for Two =

1958 video game

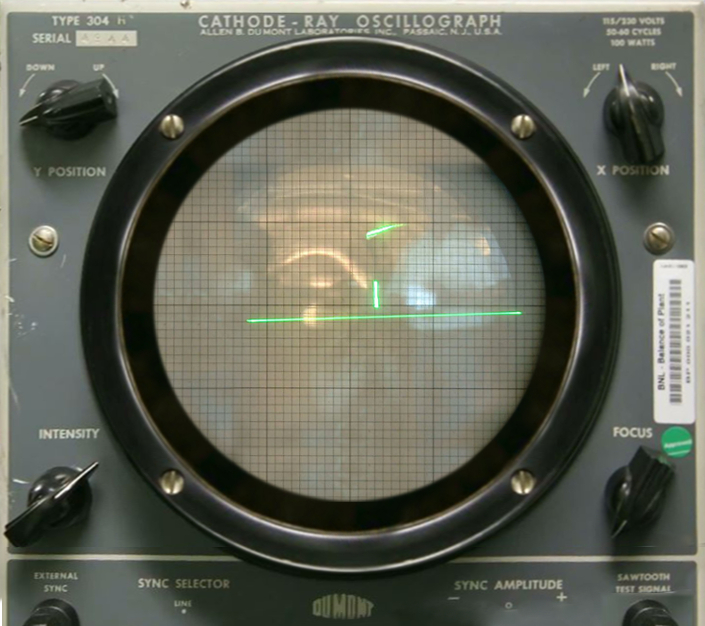
- Tennis for Two on a DuMont Lab Oscilloscope Type 304-A
- Designer: William Higinbotham
- Platform: Analog computer
- Release: US: October 18, 1958
- Genre: Sports
- Mode: Multiplayer

Tennis for Two (also known as Computer Tennis) is a 1958 sports video game designed by the American physicist William Higinbotham at the Brookhaven National Laboratory. One of the first games developed in the early history of video games, it simulates a game of tennis. Higinbotham designed the game for display at the Brookhaven National Laboratory's annual public exhibition after learning that the government research institution's Donner Model 30 analog computer could simulate trajectories with wind resistance. He designed the game within a few hours, after which he and technician Robert V. Dvorak built it over a period of three weeks. The game was displayed on an oscilloscope and played with two custom aluminum controllers. Its visuals show a representation of a tennis court viewed from the side, and players adjust the angle of their shots with a knob on their controller and try to hit the ball over the net by pressing a button.

The game was very popular during the three-day exhibition, with players lining up to see the game, especially high school students. It was shown again the following year with a larger oscilloscope screen and a more complicated design that could simulate different gravity levels. It was then dismantled and largely forgotten until the late 1970s when Higinbotham testified in court about the game during lawsuits between Magnavox and Ralph H. Baer over video game patents. Since then, it has been celebrated as one of the earliest video games, and Brookhaven has made recreations of the original device. Under some definitions Tennis for Two is considered the first video game, as while it did not include any technological innovations over prior games, it was the first computer game to be created purely as an entertainment product rather than for academic research or commercial technology promotion.

== Development ==
Reproduced version of the game built at Brookhaven for the game's 50th anniversary

In 1958, American physicist William Higinbotham worked in the Brookhaven National Laboratory in Upton, New York, as the head of the instrumentation division. Higinbotham had a bachelor's degree in physics from Williams College, and had previously worked as a technician in the physics department at Cornell University while unsuccessfully pursuing a Ph.D. there. He served as the head of the electronics division of the Manhattan Project from 1943 to 1945, and began working at Brookhaven in 1947, which focused on researching peaceful uses of atomic power. Once a year, the government research facility held an exhibition for the public, with one day each for high school students, college students, and the general public. The exhibition largely consisted of tours and static displays, with some attempts at making displays with "action", so for the 1958 exhibition Higinbotham decided to make an interactive display to entertain the visitors. While reading the instruction manual for one of Brookhaven's computers, a Donner Model 30 analog computer, he learned that the computer could calculate ballistic missile trajectories or a bouncing ball with wind resistance, and he decided to use this ability to form the foundation of a game. He later recalled his intentions were that "it might liven up the place to have a game that people could play, and which could convey the message that our scientific endeavors have relevance for society."

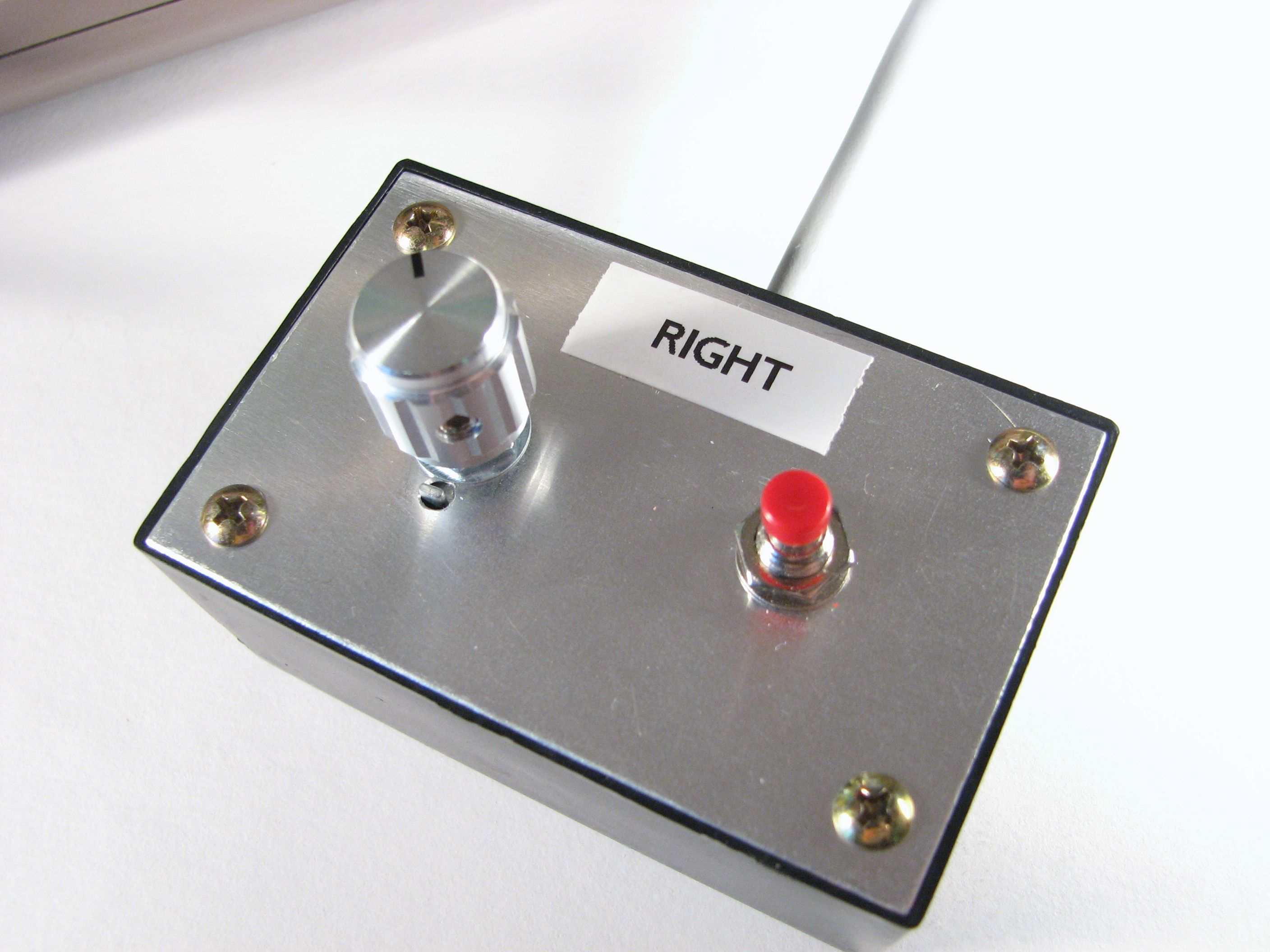
Modern recreation of the controller

Higinbotham designed a game that used an oscilloscope to display the path of a simulated ball on a tennis court viewed from the side. The attached computer calculated the path of the ball and reversed its path when it hit the ground. The game also simulated the ball hitting the net if it did not achieve a high enough arc as well as changes in velocity due to drag from air resistance. Two aluminum controllers were attached to the computer, each consisting of a button and a knob. Pressing the button hit the ball, and turning the knob controlled the angle of the shot. Originally, Higinbotham considered having a second knob to control the velocity of the shot, but decided it would make the controller too complicated. The device was designed in a few hours and was assembled over three weeks with the help of technician Robert V. Dvorak. While most of the circuitry was based on vacuum tubes and relays, the circuits to display the graphics on the 5-inch oscilloscope used transistors, then beginning to replace vacuum tubes in the electronics industry. Excluding the oscilloscope and controller, the game's circuitry approximately took up the space of a microwave oven.

== Presentation ==
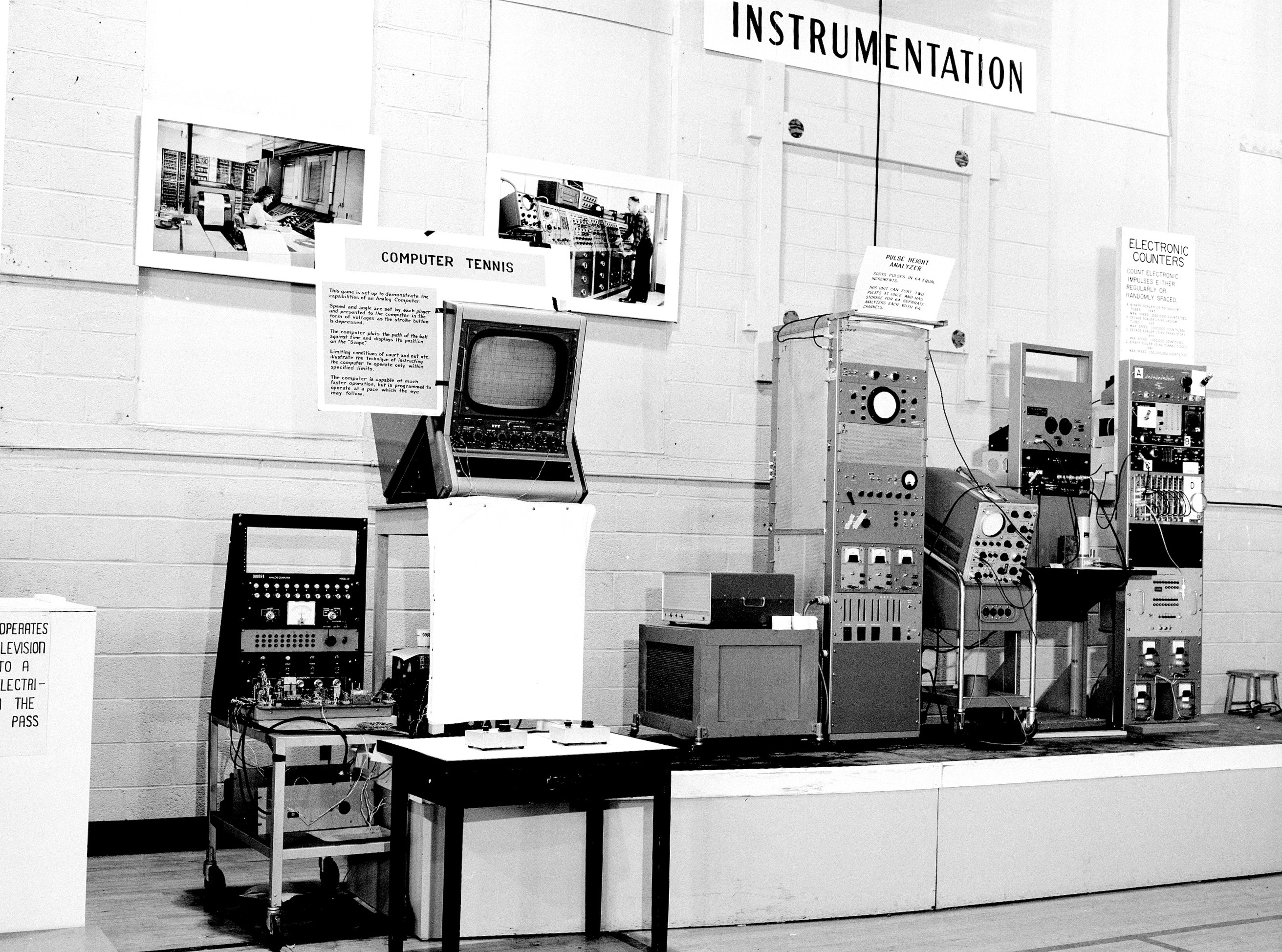
The setup for Tennis for Two as exhibited in 1959

Tennis for Two was first shown on October 18, 1958. The game environment was rendered as a horizontal line, representing the tennis court, and a short vertical line in the center, representing the tennis net as viewed edge-on. The first player would press the button on their controller to send the ball, a point of light, over the net, and it would either hit the net, reach the other side of the court, or fly out of bounds. The second player could then hit the ball back with their controller while it was on their side, either before or after it bounced on the ground. Hundreds of visitors lined up to play the new game during its debut. Higinbotham claimed later that "the high schoolers liked it best, you couldn't pull them away from it." Due to the game's popularity, an upgraded version was shown the following year, with enhancements including a larger (10–17 inch) screen and different levels of simulated gravity. Players could set the game to simulate the gravity levels of the Moon or Jupiter. Higinbotham referred to the game as Tennis for Two, though a placard attached to the 1959 version titled it "Computer Tennis". After the 1959 exhibition, the game was dismantled so its components could be put to other uses.

== Legacy ==
After being dismantled, Tennis for Two was largely forgotten. It remained virtually unknown until the late 1970s and early 1980s when Higinbotham was called on to testify in court cases for defendants sued by Magnavox over the video game patents of Ralph H. Baer. Having discovered the game, the lawyers for the defense unsuccessfully attempted to have the game declared prior art to invalidate Baer's patents on television video games, resulting in attention being given to the nearly 20-year-old game as possibly the first video game. It received further attention as the subject of articles in Creative Computing and Video Replay in 1982 and 1983 highlighting its possible status as the first video game; the editor of Creative Computing, David H. Ahl, had played Tennis for Two at Brookhaven in 1958, and dubbed Higinbotham the "Grandfather of Video Games". Higinbotham himself felt that the game was an obvious extension of the Donner Model 30's bouncing ball program and therefore not worthy of patenting or a large part of his legacy; he preferred to be remembered for his post-World War II nuclear non-proliferation work.

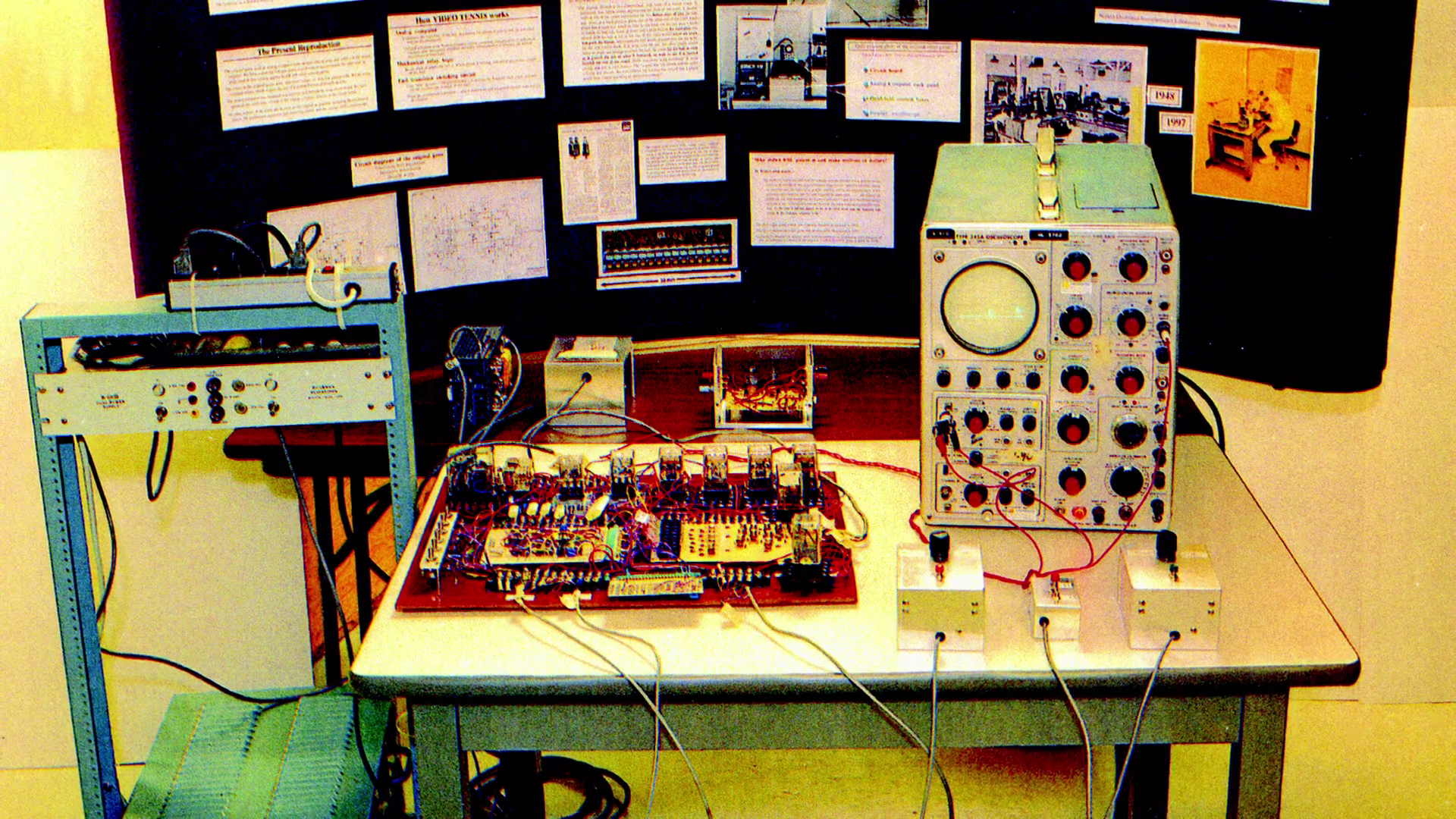
1997 recreation of the original Tennis for Two setup

In 1997, a team at Brookhaven recreated the game for Brookhaven's 50th anniversary. The reconstruction took about three months, partially because the parts were not readily available. This recreation was also displayed at the 2008 celebration of the 50th Anniversary of the original game. The replica implemented an analog computer using solid-state operational amplifier devices instead of vacuum tubes as the original Donner Model 30 did. In 2010, it was replaced with a restored Donner Model 3400 analog computer. In 2011, Stony Brook University founded the William A. Higinbotham Game Studies Collection, dedicated to "documenting the material culture of screen-based game media", and "collecting and preserving the texts, ephemera, and artifacts that document the history and work of early game innovator and Brookhaven National Laboratory scientist William A. Higinbotham, who in 1958 invented the first interactive analog computer game, Tennis for Two." (Note: Stony Brook University's statement that Tennis for Two was "the first interactive analog computer game" is likely correct depending on the definition of "game" used, but only due to the "analog computer" constraint; several games, including the 1950 Bertie the Brain and 1952 OXO, were previously developed for vacuum tube-based digital computers. One prior game run on an analog computer was Hutspiel, a 1955 war simulation game by the Operations Research Office, but the Goodyear Electronic Differential Analyzer computer had no display, and it is unclear if the computer ran the game or was only used to run requested calculations.)

Tennis for Two is considered under some definitions to be the first video game. Other candidates include the 1947 cathode-ray tube amusement device, the earliest known interactive electronic game, though it did not run on a computing device; the 1950 Bertie the Brain, the earliest known game to run on a computer, though it used light bulbs for a display; and OXO and a draughts game by Christopher Strachey in 1952, the earliest digital computer games to display visuals on an electronic screen. Tennis for Two, though it contained no technological developments to separate it from earlier games, has the distinction of being the earliest known computer game with visuals created purely for entertainment purposes. Prior games were created primarily for academic research purposes or to demonstrate the computing power of the underlying machine, with the exception of the non-computer based cathode-ray tube amusement device. This, therefore, makes Tennis for Two the first video game under some definitions from a philosophical viewpoint rather than a technical one and a distinctive moment in the early history of video games.
