= Replay: The History of Video Games =

2010 book by Tristan Donovan

- Author: Tristan Donovan
- Subject: history of video games
- Published: April 20, 2010
- Publisher: Yellow Ant
- Pages: 513
- ISBN: 978-0-9565072-0-4

Replay: The History of Video Games is a book on the history of video games by Tristan Donovan.

== Publication ==
Donovan interviewed over 140 game developers and businesspeople for the book. The book's advertising campaign, led by Cathy Campos, was recognized in PR Week.

== Reception ==
Multiple journalists praised the book's treatment of European game history, which had been neglected in previous works, and criticized its organizational structure. At the time of its release, Chris Baker of Wired wrote that Replay was the most thorough and comprehensive history of the subject. Colin Moriarty of IGN noted the book's generalist position in relation to other game histories, as of 2014. He added that Donovan's thoroughness made for an interesting story about the industry's humble origins. Moriarty appreciated Donovan's approach to the European computer-centric and pre-console history as a departure from the litany of publications on early American companies and Japan's entry into the American market.
