= OXO (video game) =

1952 video game/naughts-and-crosses simulator

- OXO played in an EDSAC simulator for the Classic Mac OS
- Designer: A S Douglas
- Platform: EDSAC
- Release: UK: 1952
- Genre: Puzzle
- Mode: Single-player

OXO is a video game developed by A S Douglas in 1952 which simulates a game of noughts and crosses (tic-tac-toe). It was one of the first games developed in the early history of video games. Douglas programmed the game as part of a thesis on human-computer interaction at the University of Cambridge.

The program was written for the Electronic Delay Storage Automatic Calculator (EDSAC). EDSAC was one of the first stored-program computers, with memory that could be read from or written to, and had three small cathode-ray tube screens to display the state of the memory; Douglas re-purposed one screen to demonstrate portraying other information to the user, such as the state of a noughts and crosses game. After the game served its purpose, it was discarded on the original hardware but later successfully reconstructed.

OXO, along with a checkers game by Christopher Strachey completed around the same time, is one of the earliest known games to display visuals on an electronic screen. Under some definitions, it thus may qualify as the first video game, though other definitions exclude it due to its lack of moving or real-time updating graphics.

== History ==
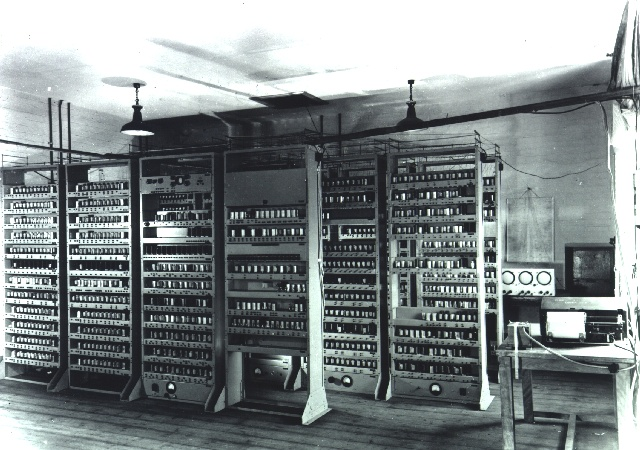
The Electronic Delay Storage Automatic Calculator in 1948

The Electronic Delay Storage Automatic Calculator (EDSAC) mainframe computer was built in the University of Cambridge's Mathematical Laboratory between 1946 and 6 May 1949, when it ran its first program, and remained in use until 11 July 1958. The EDSAC was one of the first stored-program computers, with memory that could be read from or written to, and filled an entire room; it included three 35×16 dot matrix cathode-ray tubes (CRTs) to graphically display the state of the computer's memory. As a part of a thesis on human-computer interaction, Sandy Douglas, a doctoral candidate in mathematics at the university, used one of these screens to portray other information to the user; he chose to do so via displaying the current state of a game.

Douglas used the EDSAC to simulate a game of noughts and crosses, and display the state of the game on the screen. Like other early video games, after serving Douglas's purpose, the game was discarded. Douglas did not give the game a name beyond "noughts and crosses"; the name OXO first appeared as the name of the simulation file created by computer historian Martin Campbell-Kelly while creating a simulation of the EDSAC several decades later. Around the same time that OXO was completed, Christopher Strachey expanded a checkers program he had originally written in 1951 and ported it to the Ferranti Mark 1, which showed the state of the game on a CRT display. OXO and Strachey's checkers program are the earliest known games to display visuals on an electronic screen, though it is unclear which of the two games was displayed first. As it ran on a computing device and used a graphical display, OXO is considered under some definitions to be a contender for the first video game, though under others it does not due to its lack of moving graphics or graphics which update continuously.

== Interaction ==
Each game was played by one user against an artificially intelligent opponent, which could play a "perfect" game. The player entered their input using a rotary telephone controller, selecting which of the nine squares on the board they wished to move next. Their move would appear on the screen, and then the computer's move would follow; the game display only updated when the game state changed. OXO was not available to the general public and could only be played in the University of Cambridge's Mathematical Laboratory by special permission, as the EDSAC could not be moved, and both the computer and the game were only intended for academic research purposes.
