= Sandy Douglas =

British professor of computer science

Sandy Douglas CBE
- Born: Alexander Shafto Douglas; 21 May 1921; London, England
- Died: 29 April 2010 (aged 88); London, England
- Citizenship: United Kingdom
- Education: University of Cambridge
- Known for: OXO
- Scientific career
- Fields: Computer science
- Workplaces: University of Leeds
- Thesis: Some Computations in Theoretical Physics (1954)

Alexander Shafto "Sandy" Douglas (May 21, 1921 – April 29, 2010) was a British programmer, computer science professor and video game designer. He is best known for creating OXO, the first graphical computer game, on the EDSAC computer at the University of Cambridge in 1952. Designed to simulate a game of tic-tac-toe, OXO was the earliest game to display visuals on an electronic screen.

In 1957, Douglas founded the Electronic Computing Laboratory at the University of Leeds, one of the earliest computer science departments in the United Kingdom.

== Early life and education ==
Douglas was born in London on May 21, 1921 to Quentin Douglas, a Major in the Royal Corps of Engineers, and Edith Dorothy Ingram. At the age of eight, his family relocated to Cromwell Road, near what would become the West London Air Terminal.

At the start of World War II, Douglas joined the United Kingdom's Home Guard, and was assigned to the "C" Company of the Chelsea and Kensington Battalion, part of the King's Royal Rifle Corps. During the Blitz, Douglas' unit was headquartered in the basement of the Royal School of Mines on Exhibition Road. The London Gazette reported that Douglas had commissioned into the Corps of Royal Engineers on March 7, 1943 as a Second Lieutenant, but this was later corrected to show that he actually commissioned into the Royal Corps of Signals.

In 1950, Douglas attended the University of Cambridge and began working towards earning his Ph.D. In 1952, he wrote a doctoral thesis that focused on human–computer interactions. At the time, Cambridge was home to the second stored-program computer ever built, the EDSAC or Electronic Delay Storage Automatic Calculator (the first being Manchester University's "Baby," which ran its inaugural program on June 21, 1948). Seeking an opportunity to prove his thesis findings, Douglas programmed the code for a simple game, where a player competed against the computer in a game of tic-tac-toe. The EDSAC had three cathode-ray-tube screens for graphically displaying the computer's memory states; Douglas hijacked one of the screens to display the current state of the game instead. OXO's use of a graphical display made it a forerunner of the first video games.

== Career ==
=== 1953–1957: Trinity College ===
Following his graduation, Douglas was awarded a Prize Fellowship at Trinity College, Cambridge, where he later became a junior bursar. He was also an assistant professor at the University of Illinois Urbana-Champaign, where he worked at the Computing Laboratory for a year.

=== 1957–1960: University of Leeds ===
In 1957, Douglas moved to the University of Leeds, and oversaw the university's installation of a Ferranti Pegasus vacuum-tube computer in the nearby Eldon Chapel. Douglas established the university's first computer laboratory within the Department of Mathematics, and began offering some of the earliest programming courses in the United Kingdom to students; it was there that he first became interested in the application of computers to business problems.

The Pegasus holds an especial place in my affection, it being the machine I installed as the central University machine in a disused chapel in Leeds in 1957 – it was known as Lucifer, for Leeds University Computing Installation (FERranti). Our au pair girl from Spain made a beautiful little devilish doll which decorated the machine – it has probably disappeared by now.

In June 1960, the Committee of Vice-Chancellors and Principals at the university set up a working party to explore the creation of a national system for handling university admissions. Douglas was appointed a member of the party, and provided advice on the use of computers for this system. Douglas had previously worked with university administrator Ronald Kay on "an early and primitive but successful attempt to introduce computer methods into student registration procedures." Kay would later be named General Secretary of the Universities Central Council on Admissions.

=== 1960–1968: C-E-I-R Holdings Ltd ===
In 1960, Douglas was headhunted by the British subsidiary of C-E-I-R (later known as Scientific Control Systems) and hired as a technical director. Douglas performed consultancy work at C-E-I-R for several years.

=== Later years ===
In 1968, Douglas left C-E-I-R and joined Leasco Systems and Research Ltd as a research director. Shortly afterwards, Douglas was appointed Professor of Computational Methods at the London School of Economics, and worked with professor Frank Land to establish the Information Systems Group within the university's Department of Statistics.

== Personal life ==
Douglas was married to Audrey Mary Brasnett Parker. The couple had two children; Shirley Douglas (born in 1954) and Andrew Douglas (born in 1956).

On April 29, 2010, Douglas died in his sleep from pneumonia.

== Notable publications ==
Douglas published more than 60 papers in fields such as atomic physics, crystallography, mathematics, and computer science.

- A. S. Douglas. "Living with Computers," in Special Edition: Computers in the Seventies, Science Journal, Vol 6, No. 10, pp. 35-41.
- Alexander Shafto Douglas. "Computers and Society: An Inaugural Lecture," delivered on April 27, 1972. London School of Economics, 1973. ISBN 978-0-85328-019-4.
- Sandy Douglas. "Some Memories of EDSAC I: 1950–1952." IEEE Annals of the History of Computing, Vol. 1, No. 2, pp, 98–99, 208, October 1979. doi:10.1109/MAHC.1979.10018
- Alexander S. Douglas. "Computers and Communications in the 1980s: Benefits and Problems." Computer Networks, Vol. 5, Issue 1, pp. 9–14, February 1981.
