= Arcade game =

Coin-operated entertainment machine

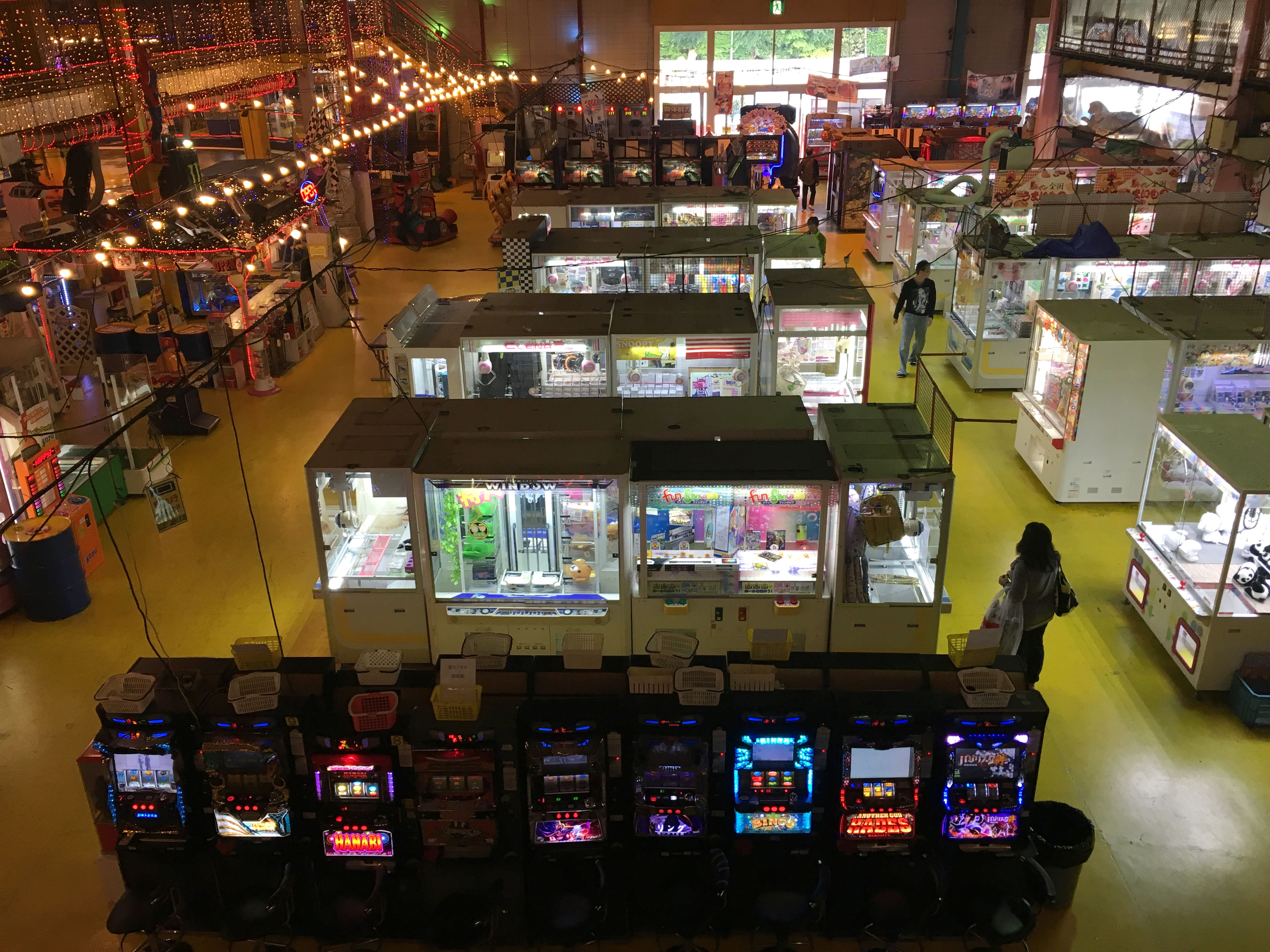
An amusement arcade featuring several different types of arcade games, located in Chiba Prefecture, Japan

An arcade game, or coin-op game, is a coin-operated entertainment machine typically installed in public businesses such as restaurants, bars and amusement arcades. Most arcade games are presented as primarily games of skill and include arcade video games, pinball machines, electro-mechanical games, redemption games or merchandisers.

== Types ==
Broadly, arcade games are nearly always considered games of skill, with only some elements of games of chance. Games that are solely games of chance, like slot machines and pachinko, often are categorized legally as gambling devices and, due to restrictions, may not be made available to minors or without appropriate oversight in many jurisdictions.

=== Arcade video games ===
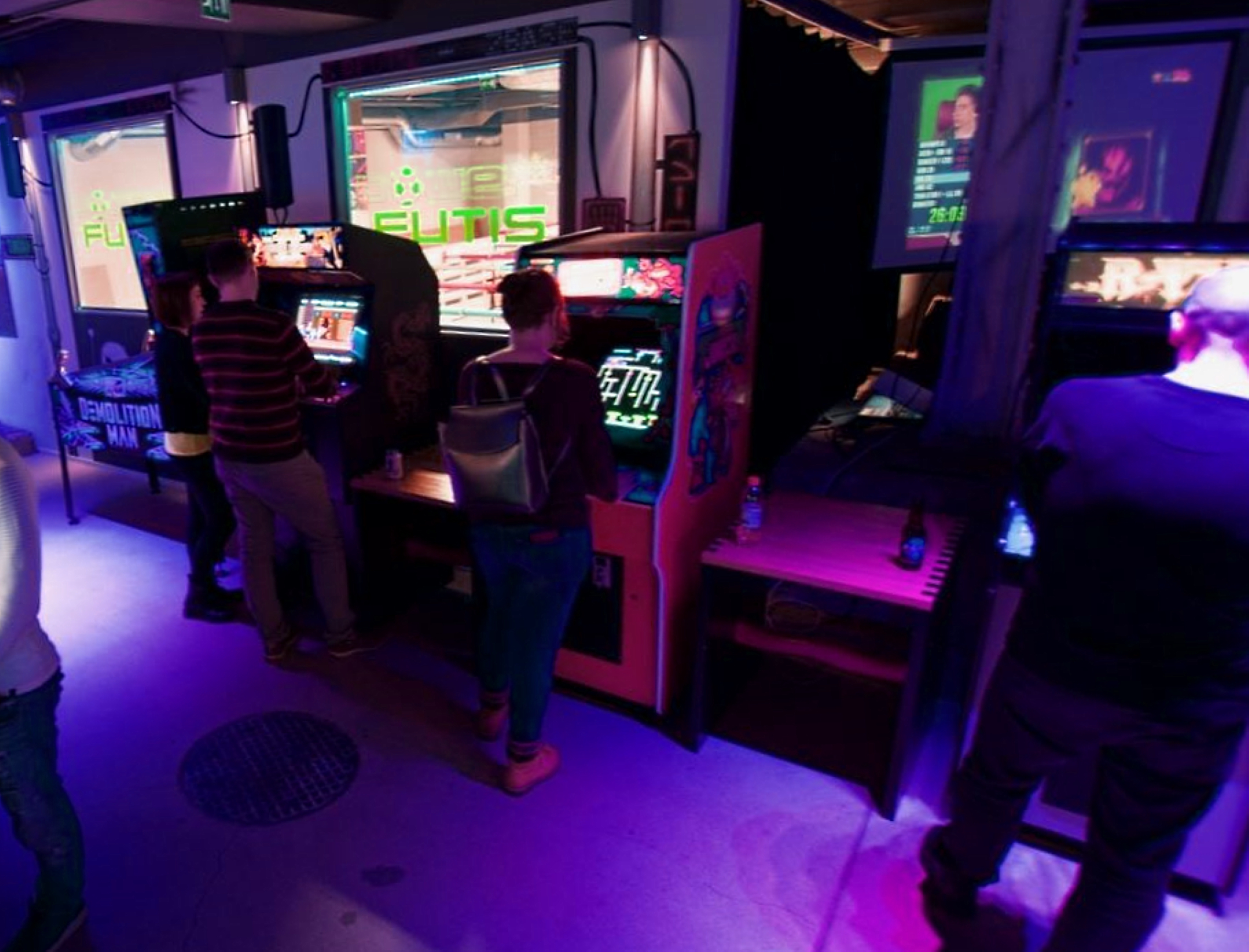
Arcade video games at ZBase Entertainment Center in Tampere, Finland

Arcade video games were first introduced in the early 1970s, with Pong as the first commercially successful game. Arcade video games use electronic or computerized circuitry to take input from the player and translate that to an electronic display such as a monitor or television set.

=== Carnival games ===
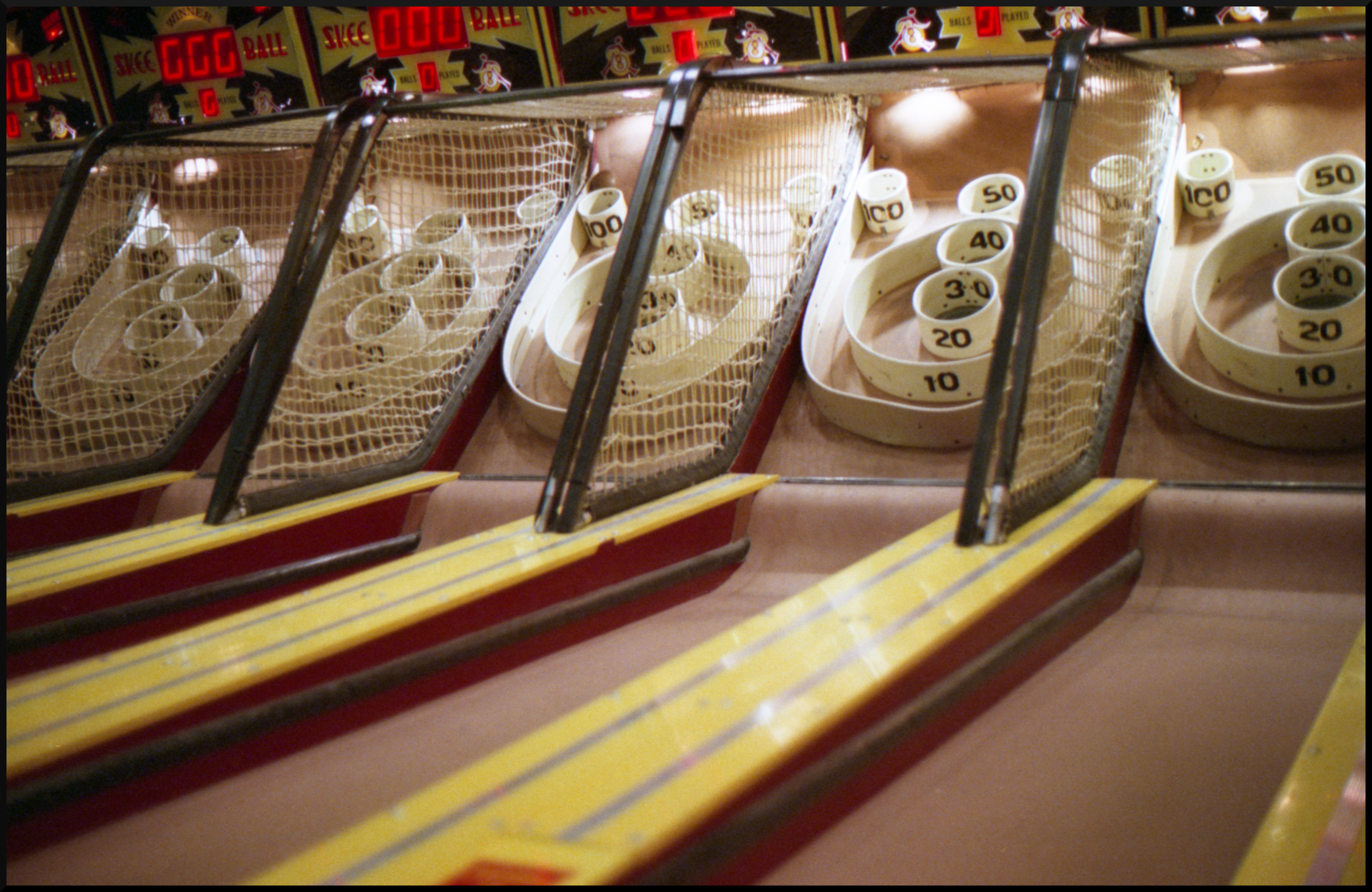
Skee-Ball was one of the first arcade games developed.

Coin-op carnival games are automated versions or variations of popular staffed games held at carnival midways. Most of these are played for prizes or tickets for redemption. Common examples include Skee-Ball and Whac-A-Mole.

=== Electro-mechanical games ===
Electro-mechanical games (EM games) operate on a combination of some electronic circuitry and mechanical actions from the player to move items contained within the game's cabinet. Some of these were early light gun games using light-sensitive sensors on targets to register hits. Examples of electro-mechanical games include Periscope and Rifleman from the 1960s.

EM games typically combined mechanical engineering technology with various electrical components, such as motors, switches, resistors, solenoids, relays, bells, buzzers and electric lights. EM games lie somewhere in the middle between fully electronic games and mechanical games.

EM games have a number of different genres/categories. "Novelty" or "land-sea-air" games refer to simulation games that simulate aspects of various vehicles, such as cars (similar to racing video games), submarines (similar to vehicular combat video games), or aircraft (similar to combat flight simulator video games). Gun games refer to games that involve shooting with a gun-like peripheral (such as a light gun or similar device), similar to light gun shooter video games. "General" arcade games refer to all other types of EM arcade games, including various different types of sports games. "Audio-visual" or "realistic" games referred to novelty games that used advanced special effects to provide a simulation experience.

=== Merchandiser games ===
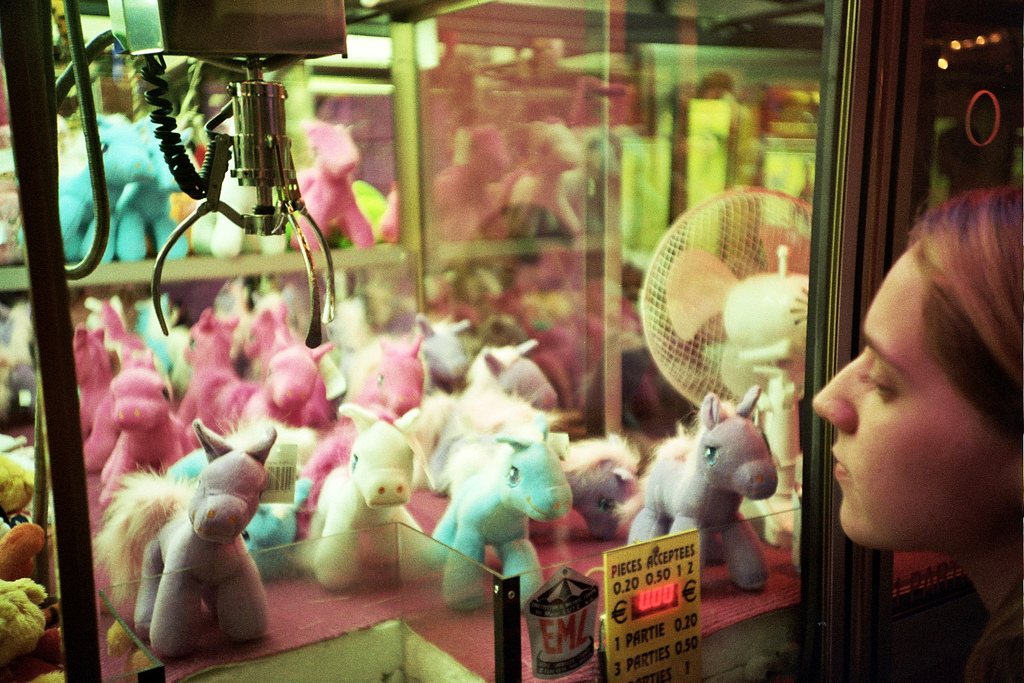
A claw crane game, where one must time the movement of the claw to grab a prize

Merchandiser games are those where the player attempts to win a prize by performing some physical action with the arcade machine, such as claw crane games or coin pusher games.

=== Pachinko ===
Pachinko is a type of mechanical game originating in Japan. It is used as both a form of recreational arcade game and much more frequently as a gambling device, filling a Japanese gambling niche comparable to that of the slot machine in Western gambling.

=== Photo booths ===
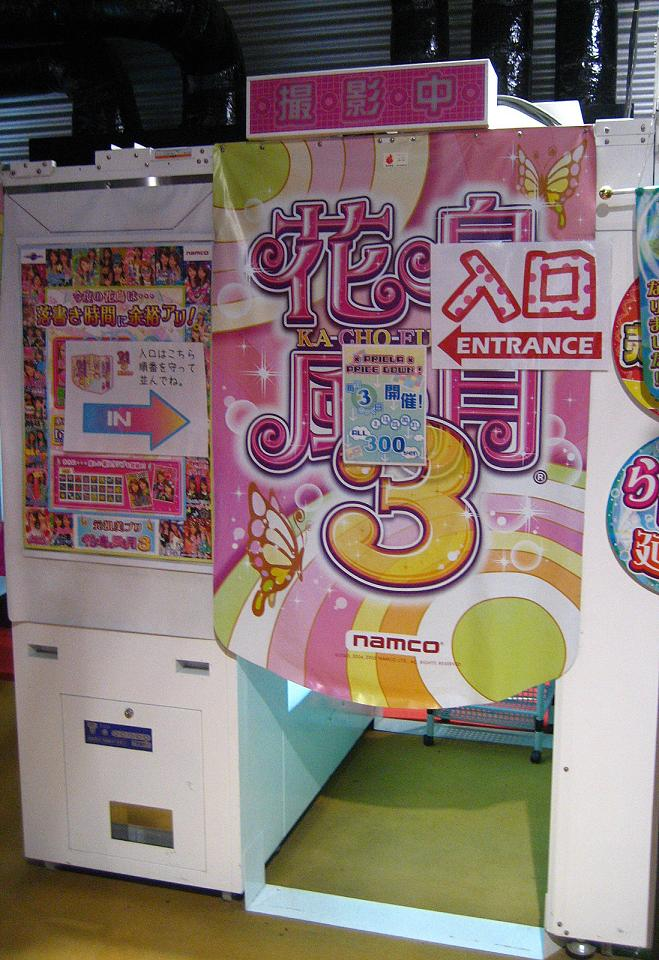
A purikura photo sticker booth in Fukushima City, Japan

Coin-operated photo booths automatically take and develop three or four wallet-sized pictures of subjects within the small space, and more recently using digital photography. They are typically used for licenses or passports, but there have been several types of photo booths designed for amusement arcades.

At the Amusement & Music Operators Association (AMOA) show in October 1975, Taito introduced an arcade photo booth machine that combines closed-circuit television (CCTV) recording with computer printing technology to produce self-portrait photographs. Two other arcade manufacturers introduced their own computerized arcade photo booth machines at the same show.

A specific variety designed for arcades, purikura, creates selfie photo stickers. Purikura are essentially a cross between a traditional license/passport photo booth and an arcade video game, with a computer which allows the manipulation of digital images. Introduced by Atlus and Sega in 1995, the name is a shortened form of the registered trademark Print Club (プリント倶楽部, Purinto Kurabu). They are primarily found in Asian arcades.

=== Pinball machines ===
Pinball machines are games that have a large, enclosed, slanted table with a number of scoring features on its surface. Players launch a steel ball onto the table and, using pinball flippers, try to keep the ball in play while scoring as many points as possible. Early pinball games were mostly driven through mechanical components, while pinball games from the 1930s onward include electronic components such as lights and sensors and are one form of an electro-mechanical game.

=== Slot machines ===
In limited jurisdictions, slot machines may also be considered an arcade game and installed alongside other games in arcades. However, as slot machines are mostly games of chance, their use in this manner is highly limited. They are most often used for gambling.

=== Sports games ===
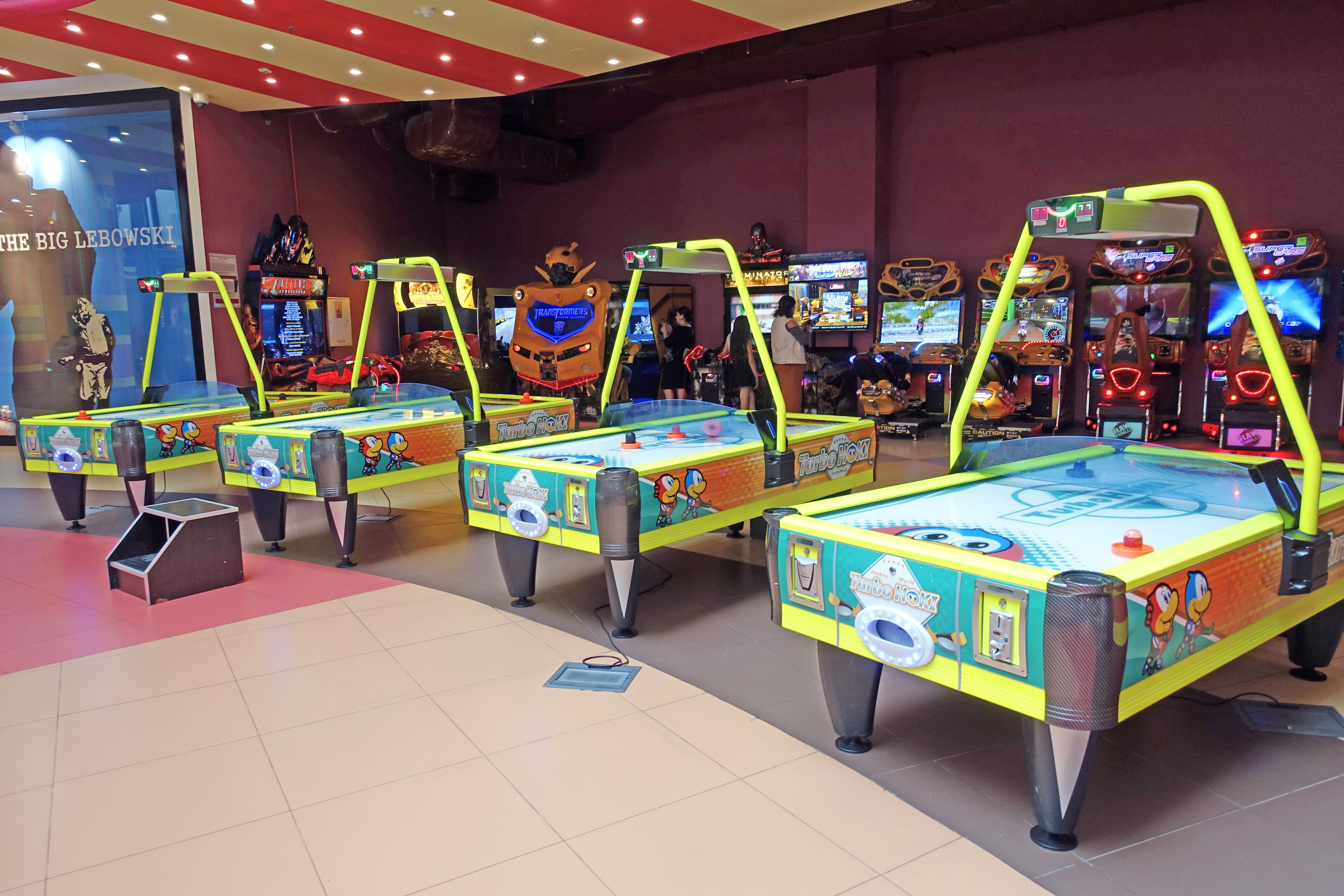
Air hockey tables at an arcade

Sport games are indoor or miniaturized versions of popular physical sports that can be played within an arcade setting often with a reduced ruleset. Examples include air hockey and indoor basketball games like Super Shot. Sports games can be either mechanical, electro-mechanical or electronic.

=== Redemption games ===
A general category of arcade games are those played for tickets that can be redeemed for prizes. The gameplay itself can be of any arcade game, and the number of tickets received are proportional to the player's score. Skee ball is often played as a redemption game, while pachinko is one of the most popular redemption games in Japan. Another type of redemption game are medal game, popular in Japan and southeast Asia, where players must convert their money into special medal coins to play the game, but can win more coins which they can redeem back into prizes. Medal games are design to simulate a gambling-like experience without running afoul of Japan's strict laws against gambling.

== "Game of skill" versus "game of chance" ==
Arcade games have generally struggled to avoid being labelled wholly as games of chance or luck, which would qualify them as gambling and require them to be strictly regulated in most government jurisdictions. Games of chance generally involve games where a player pays money to participate for the opportunity to win a prize, where the likelihood to win that prize is primarily driven by chance rather than skill. Akin to sweepstakes and lotteries, slot machines are typically cataloged as games of chance and thus not typically included in arcades outside of certain jurisdictions.

Pinball machines initially were branded as games of chance in the 1940s as, after launching the ball, the player had no means to control its outcome. Coupled with fears of pinball being a "tool of the devil" over the youth of that time period, several jurisdictions took steps to label pinball as games of chance and banned them from arcades. After the invention of the electric flipper in 1947, which gave the player more control on the fate of the ball after launching, pinball manufacturers pushed to reclassify pinball as games of skill. New York City's ban on pinball was overturned in 1976 when Roger Sharpe, a journalist, demonstrated the ability to call a shot to a specific lane to the city's council to prove pinball was a game of skill.

Prize redemption games such as crane games and coin drop games have been examined as a mixed continuum between games of chance and skill. In a crane game, for example, there is some skill in determining how to position the crane claw over a prize, but the conditions of the strength and condition of the claw and the stacking of the prize are sufficiently unknown parameters to make whether the player will be successful a matter of luck. The Dominant Factor Test is typically used to designate when arcade games are games of chance and thus subject to gambling laws, but for many redemption games, its application is a grey area.

Nearly all arcade video games tend to be treated as games of skill, challenging the player against the pre-set programming of the game. However, arcade video games that replicate gambling concepts, such as video poker machines, had emerged in the 1980s. These are generally treated as games of chance, and remained confined to jurisdictions with favorable gambling laws.

== History ==
=== Skee-Ball and carnival games (late 19th century to 1940s) ===
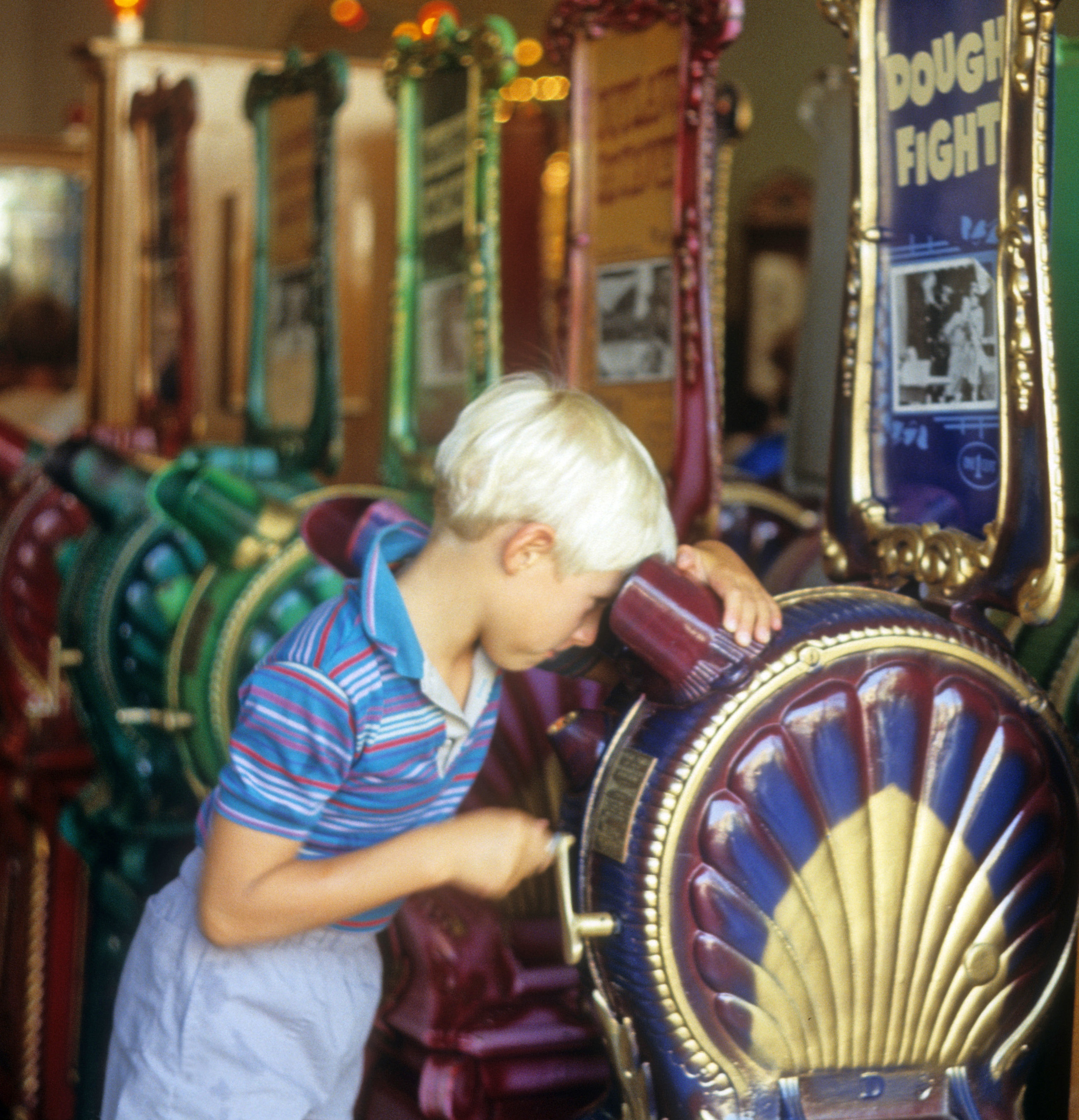
A row of mutoscopes at a Disneyland penny arcade in the 1980s

Game of skill amusements had been a staple of fairs since the 19th century. Further, the invention of coin-operated vending machines had come about in the 19th century. To build on this, coin-operated automated amusement machines were created, such as fortune telling and strength tester machines as well as mutoscopes, and installed along with other attractions at fairs, traveling carnivals, and resorts. Soon, entrepreneurs began housing these coin-operated devices in the same facilities which required minimal oversight, creating penny arcades near the turn of the 20th century, the name taken from the common use of a single penny to operate the machine.

Penny arcades started to gain a negative reputation as the most popular attraction in them tended to be mutoscopes featuring risqué and softcore pornography while drawing audiences of young men. Further, the birth of the film industry in the 1910s and 1920s drew audiences away from the penny arcade. New interactive coin-operated machines were created to bring back patrons to the penny arcades, creating the first arcade games. Many were based on carnival games of a larger scope, but reduced to something which could be automated. One popular style were pin-based games which were based on the 19th century game of bagatelle. One of the first such pin-based games was Baffle Ball, a precursor to the pinball machine where players were given a limited number of balls to hit certain targets with only a plunger. Skee-Ball became popular after being featured at an Atlantic City boardwalk arcade. The popularity of these games was aided by the impact of the Great Depression of the 1930s, as they provided inexpensive entertainment.

Abstract mechanical sports games date back to the turn of the 20th century in England, which was the main manufacturer of arcade games in the early 20th century. The London-based Automatic Sports Company manufactured abstract sports games based on British sports, including Yacht Racer (1900) based on yacht racing, and The Cricket Match (1903) which simulated a portion of a cricket game by having the player hit a pitch into one of various holes. Full Team Football (1925) by London-based Full Team Football Company was an early mechanical tabletop football game simulating association football, with eleven static players on each side of the pitch that can kick a ball using levers. Driving games originated from British arcades in the 1930s.

Shooting gallery carnival games date back to the late 19th century. Mechanical gun games had existed in England since the turn of the 20th century. The earliest rudimentary examples of mechanical interactive film games date back to the early 20th century, with "cinematic shooting gallery" games. They were similar to shooting gallery carnival games, except that players shot at a cinema screen displaying film footage of targets. They showed footage of targets, and when a player shot the screen at the right time, it would trigger a mechanism that temporarily pauses the film and registers a point. The first successful example of such a game was Life Targets, released in the United Kingdom in 1912. Cinematic shooting gallery games enjoyed short-lived popularity in several parts of Britain during the 1910s, and often had safari animals as targets, with footage recorded from British imperial colonies. Cinematic shooting gallery games declined some time after the 1910s.

The first light guns appeared in the 1930s, with Seeburg Ray-O-Lite (1936). Games using this toy rifle were mechanical and the rifle fired beams of light at targets wired with sensors. A later gun game from Seeburg Corporation, Shoot the Bear (1949), introduced the use of mechanical sound effects. Mechanical maze games appeared in penny arcades by the mid-20th century; they only allowed the player to manipulate the entire maze, unlike later maze video games which allowed the player to manipulate individual elements within a maze.

=== Pinball (1930s to 1960s) ===
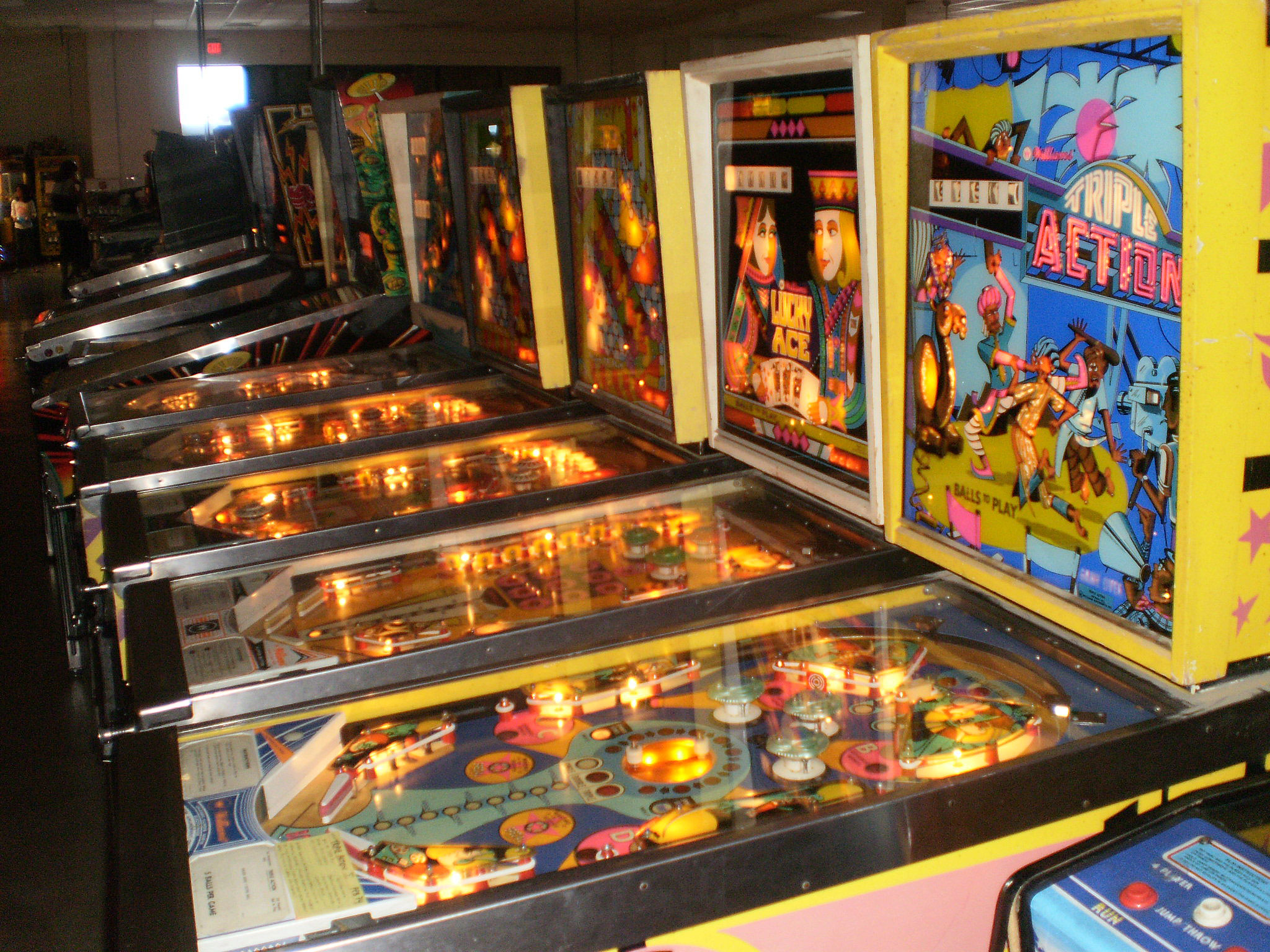
Pinball machines from the 1960s at the Pinball Hall of Fame

Coin-operated pinball machines that included electric lights and features were developed in 1933, but lacked the user-controlled flipper mechanisms at that point; these would be invented in 1947. Though the creators of these games argued that these games were still skill-based, many governments still considered them to be games of luck and ruled them as gambling devices. As such, they were initially banned in many cities. Pinball machines were also divisive between the young and the old and were arguably emblematic of the generation gap found in America at the time. Some elders feared what the youth were doing and considered pinball machines to be "tools of the devil". This led to even more bans. These bans were slowly lifted in the 1960s and 1970s; New York City's ban, placed in 1942, lasted until 1976, while Chicago's was lifted in 1977. Where pinball was allowed, pinball manufacturers carefully distanced their games from gambling, adding "For Amusement Only" among the game's labeling, eliminating any redemption features, and asserting these were games of skill at every opportunity. By the early 1970s, pinball machines thus occupied select arcades at amusement parks, at bars and lounges, and with solitary machines at various stores.

Pinball machines beyond the 1970s have since advanced with similar improvement in technology as with arcade video games. Past machines used discrete electro-mechanical and electronic componentry for game logic, but newer machines have switched to solid-state electronics with microprocessors to handle these elements, making games more versatile. Newer machines may have complex mechanical actions and detailed backplate graphics that are supported by these technologies.

=== Electro-mechanical games (1940s to 1970s) ===
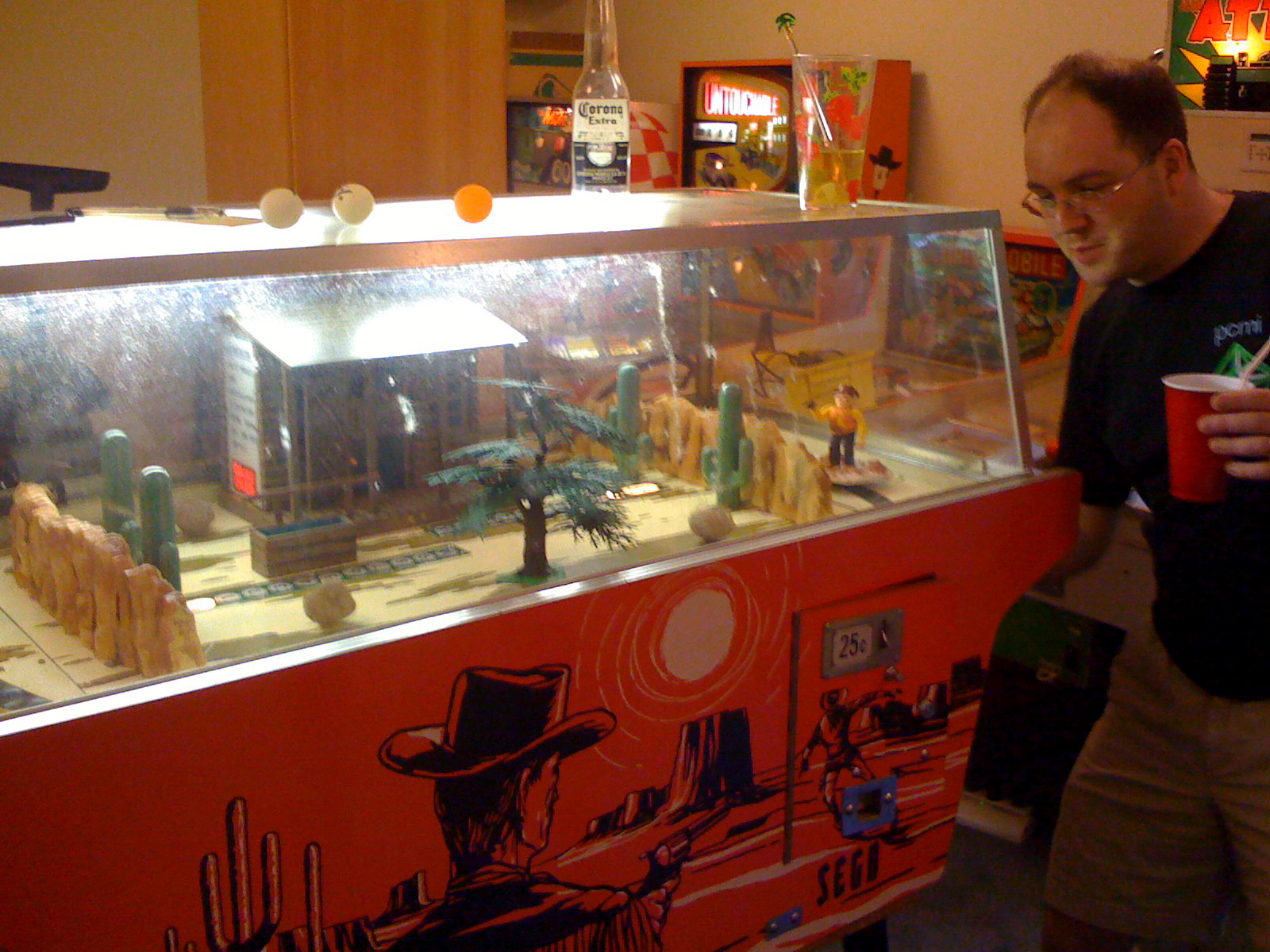
Sega's Gun Fight (1969), a two-player EM game that used light-sensitive targets. It was one of the first games with head-to-head shooting, inspiring arcade shooter video games such as Gun Fight (1975).

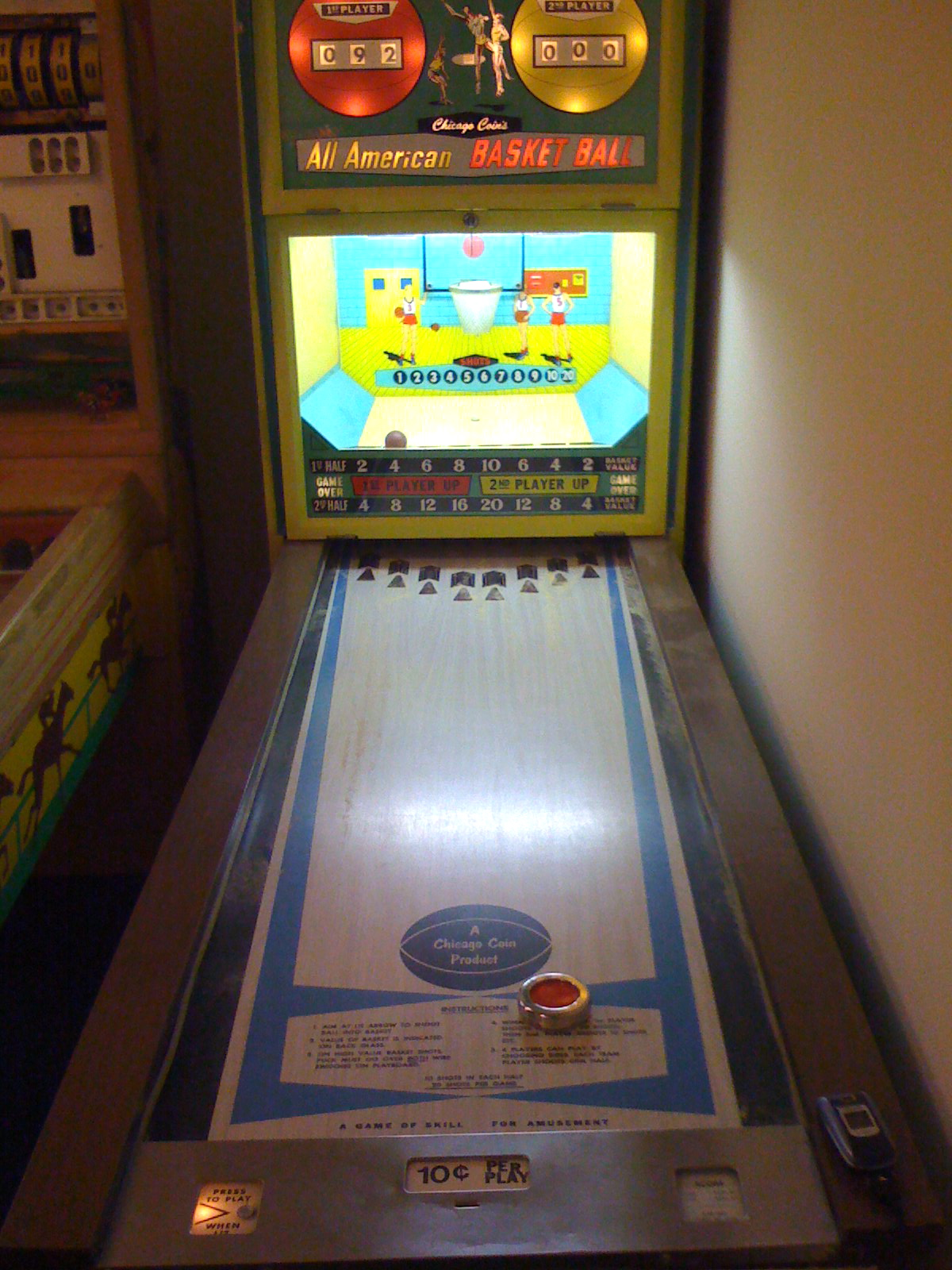
All American Basket Ball (1969), an EM game produced by Chicago Coin

Alternatives to pinball were electro-mechanical games (EM games) that clearly demonstrated themselves as games of skill to avoid the stigma of pinball. The transition from mechanical arcade games to EM games dates back to around the time of World War II, with different types of arcade games gradually making the transition during the post-war period between the 1940s and 1960s. Some early electro-mechanical games were designed not for commercial purposes but to demonstrate the state of technology at public expositions, such as Nimatron in 1940 or Bertie the Brain in 1950.

In 1941, International Mutoscope Reel Company released the electro-mechanical driving game Drive Mobile, which had an upright arcade cabinet similar to what arcade video games would later use. It was derived from older British driving games from the 1930s. In Drive Mobile, a steering wheel was used to control a model car over a road painted on a metal drum, with the goal being to keep the car centered as the road shifts left and right. Kasco (short for Kansai Seisakusho Co.) introduced this type of electro-mechanical driving game to Japan in 1958 with Mini Drive, which followed a similar format but had a longer cabinet allowing a longer road. By 1961, however, the US arcade industry had been stagnating. This in turn had a negative effect on Japanese arcade distributors such as Sega that had been depending on US imports up until then. Sega co-founder David Rosen responded to market conditions by having Sega develop original arcade games in Japan.

From the late 1960s, EM games incorporated more elaborate electronics and mechanical action to create a simulated environment for the player. These games overlapped with the introduction of arcade video games, and in some cases, were prototypical of the experiences that arcade video games offered. The late 1960s to early 1970s were considered the "electro-mechanical golden age" in Japan, and the "novelty renaissance" or "technological renaissance" in North America. A new category of "audio-visual" novelty games emerged during this era, mainly established by several Japanese arcade manufacturers. Arcades had previously been dominated by jukeboxes, before a new wave of EM arcade games emerged that were able to generate significant earnings for arcade operators.

Periscope, a submarine simulator and light gun shooter, was released by Nakamura Manufacturing Company (later called Namco) in 1965 and then by Sega in 1966. It used lights and plastic waves to simulate sinking ships from a submarine, and had players look through a periscope to direct and fire torpedoes, which were represented by colored lights and electronic sound effects. Sega's version became a major success worldwide. It was the first arcade game to cost a quarter per play, and was a turning point for the arcade industry. Periscope revived the novelty game business, and established a "realistic" or "audio-visual" category of games, using advanced special effects to provide a simulation experience. It was the catalyst for the "novelty renaissance" where a wide variety of novelty/specialty games (also called "land-sea-air" games) were released during the late 1960s to early 1970s, from quiz games and racing games to hockey and football games, many adopting the quarter-play price point. These "audio-visual" games were selling in large quantities that had not been approached by most arcade machines in years. This led to a "technological renaissance" in the late 1960s, which would later be critical in establishing a healthy arcade environment for video games to flourish in the 1970s. Periscope also established a trend of missile-launching gameplay during the late 1960s to 1970s. In the late 1960s, Sega began producing gun games which resemble shooter video games, but which were EM games that used rear image projection to produce moving animations on a screen. It was a fresh approach to gun games that Sega introduced with Duck Hunt, which began location testing in 1968 and released in January 1969. Missile, a shooter and vehicular combat game released by Sega in 1969, may have been the first arcade game to use a joystick with a fire button, leading to joysticks subsequently becoming the standard control scheme for arcade games.

A new type of driving game was introduced in Japan, with Kasco's 1968 racing game Indy 500, which was licensed by Chicago Coin for release in North America as Speedway in 1969. It had a circular racetrack with rival cars painted on individual rotating discs illuminated by a lamp, which produced colorful graphics projected using mirrors to give a pseudo-3D first-person perspective on a screen, resembling a windscreen view. It had collision detection, with players having to dodge cars to avoid crashing, as well as electronic sound for the car engines and collisions. This gave it greater realism than earlier driving games, and it resembled a prototypical arcade racing video game, with an upright cabinet, yellow marquee, three-digit scoring, coin box, steering wheel and accelerator pedal. Indy 500 sold over 2,000 arcade cabinets in Japan, while Speedway sold over 10,000 cabinets in North America, becoming the biggest arcade hit in years. Like Periscope, Speedway also charged a quarter per play, further cementing quarter-play as the US arcade standard for over two decades. Atari founder Nolan Bushnell, when he was a college student, worked at an arcade where he became familiar with EM games such as Speedway, watching customers play and helping to maintain the machinery, while learning how it worked and developing his understanding of how the game business operates.

Following the arrival of arcade video games with Pong (1972) and its clones, EM games continued to have a strong presence in arcades for much of the 1970s. In Japan, EM games remained more popular than video games up until the late 1970s. In the United States, after the market became flooded with Pong clones, the Pong market crashed around the mid-1970s, which led to traditional Chicago coin-op manufacturers mainly sticking to EM games up until the late 1970s. EM games eventually declined following the arrival of Space Invaders (1978) and the golden age of arcade video games in the late 1970s. Several EM games that appeared in the 1970s have remained popular in arcades through to the present day, notably air hockey, whac-a-mole and medal games. Medal games started becoming popular with Sega's Harness Racing (1974), Nintendo's EVR Race (1975) and Aruze's The Derby Vφ (1975). The first whac-a-mole game, Mogura Taiji ("Mole Buster"), was released by TOGO in 1975. In the late 1970s, arcade centers in Japan began to be flooded with "mole buster" games. Mogura Taiji was introduced to North America in 1976, which inspired Bob's Space Racers to produce their own version of the game called "Whac-A-Mole" in 1977. Sega released an EM game similar to air hockey in 1968, MotoPolo, where two players moved around motorbikes to knock balls into the opponent's goal; it also used an 8-track player to play back the sounds of the motorbikes. Air hockey itself was later created by a group of Brunswick Billiards employees between 1969 and 1972. EM games experienced a resurgence during the 1980s. Air hockey, whac-a-mole and medal games have since remained popular arcade attractions.

=== Arcade video games (1970s to present) ===
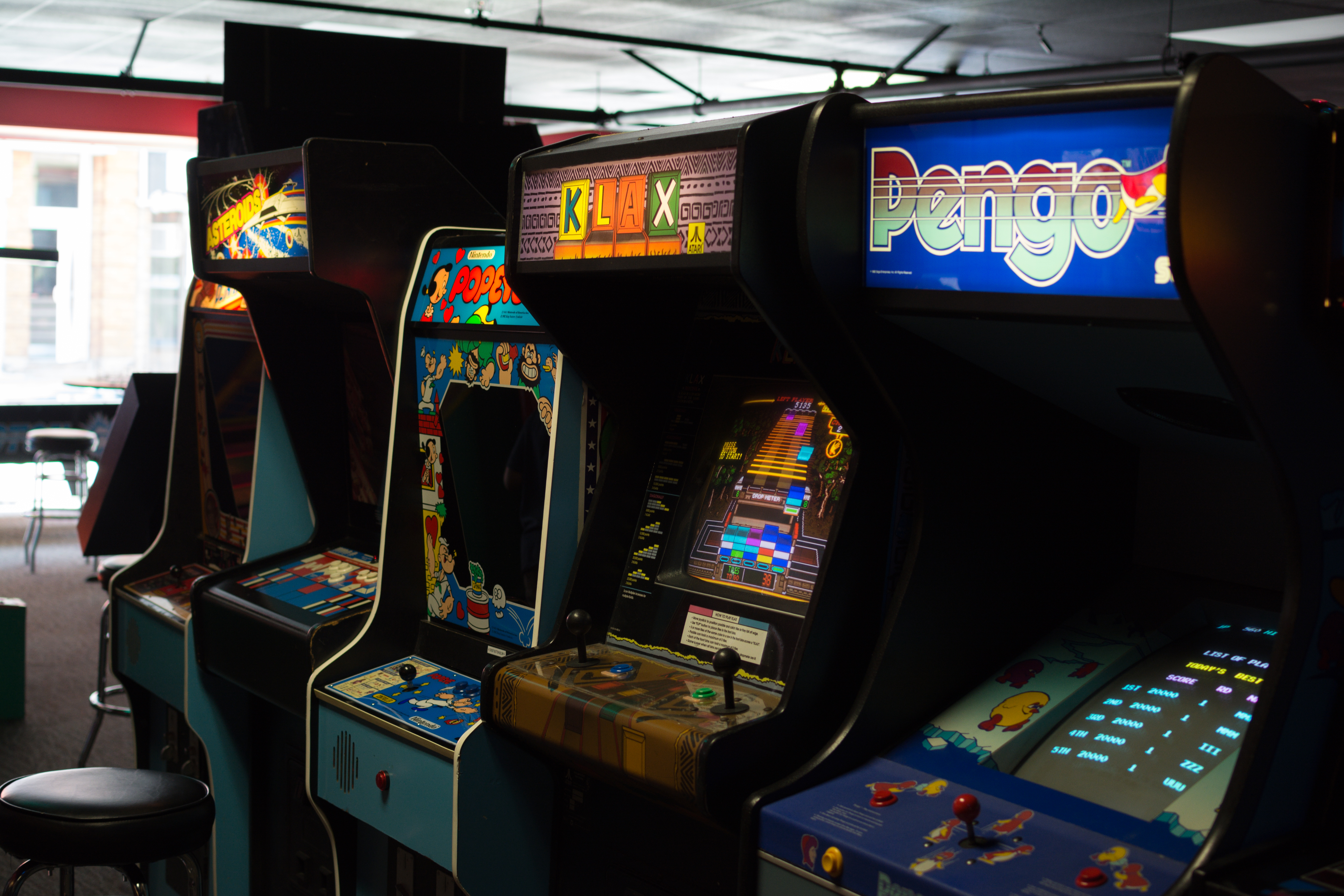
A row of video games at an arcade

After two attempts to package mainframe computers running video games into a coin-operated arcade cabinet in 1971, Galaxy Game and Computer Space, Atari released Pong in 1972, the first successful arcade video game. The number of arcade game makers greatly increased over the next several years, including several of the companies that had been making EM games such as Midway, Bally, Williams, Sega, and Taito. As technology moved from transistor-transistor logic (TTL) integrated circuits to microprocessors, a new wave of arcade video games arose, starting with Taito's Space Invaders in 1978 and leading to a golden age of arcade video games that included Pac-Man (Namco, 1980), Missile Command (Atari, 1980), and Donkey Kong (Nintendo, 1981). The golden age waned in 1983 due to an excess number of arcade games, the growing draw of home video game consoles and computers, and a moral panic on the impact of arcade video games on youth. The arcade industry was also partially impacted by the video game crash of 1983.

The arcade market had recovered by 1986, with the help of software conversion kits, the arrival of popular beat 'em up games (such as Kung-Fu Master and Renegade), and advanced motion simulator games (such as Sega's "taikan" games including Hang-On, Space Harrier and Out Run). However, the growth of home video game systems such as the Nintendo Entertainment System led to another brief arcade decline towards the end of the 1980s. Fighting games like Street Fighter II (1991) and Mortal Kombat (1992) helped to revive it in the early 1990s, leading to a renaissance for the arcade industry. 3D graphics were popularized in arcades during the early 1990s with games such as Sega's Virtua Racing and Virtua Fighter, with later arcade systems such as the Sega Model 3 remaining considerably more advanced than home systems through the late 1990s. However, the improved capabilities of home consoles and computers to mimic arcade video games during this time drew crowds away from arcades.

Up until about 1996, arcade video games had remained the largest sector of the global video game industry, before arcades declined in the late 1990s, with the console market surpassing arcade video games for the first time around 1997–1998. Arcade video games declined in the Western world during the 2000s, with most arcades serving highly specialized experiences that cannot be replicated in the home, including lines of pinball and other arcade games, coupled with other entertainment options such as restaurants or bars. Among newer arcade video games include games like Dance Dance Revolution that require specialized equipment, as well as games incorporating motion simulation or virtual reality. Arcade games had remained popular in Asian regions until around the late 2010s as popularity began to wane; when once there were around 26,000 arcades in Japan in 1986, there were only about 4,000 in 2019. The COVID-19 pandemic in 2020 and 2021 also drastically hit the arcade industry, forcing many of the large long-standing arcades in Japan to close.

=== Decline ===
Due to the profitability and technological advances in consoles and computers, which came to have hardware superior to arcade machines, as well as the possibility of playing online, the proliferation of cybercafés and other factors, arcade machines gradually lost popularity until they nearly disappeared. This forced companies specialized in the sector, such as Midway, to enter the console market and stop producing arcade machines.

The evolution of arcade video games has been scientifically studied as a process of cultural evolution. Dr. Valverde's article analyzes thousands of games to observe how different genres emerge, diversify, and disappear. It shows that innovation and collaboration among developers favor the survival of genres. In contrast, when imitation predominates and innovation is lacking, some genres enter a period of decline and eventually collapse.

== Trade associations ==
=== American Amusement Machine Association ===
The American Amusement Machine Association (AAMA) is a trade association established in 1981. It represents the American coin-operated amusement machine industry, including 120 arcade game distributors and manufacturers.

=== Amusement & Music Operators Association ===
The Amusement & Music Operators (AMOA), a trade founded in 1948. It was composed by 1,700 members up to 1995. In music industry, forged license-compliance programs with right groups ASCAP, BMI or SESAC, and it represented the United States' licensed jukebox owners.
