= Nimrod (computer) =

1951 British computer

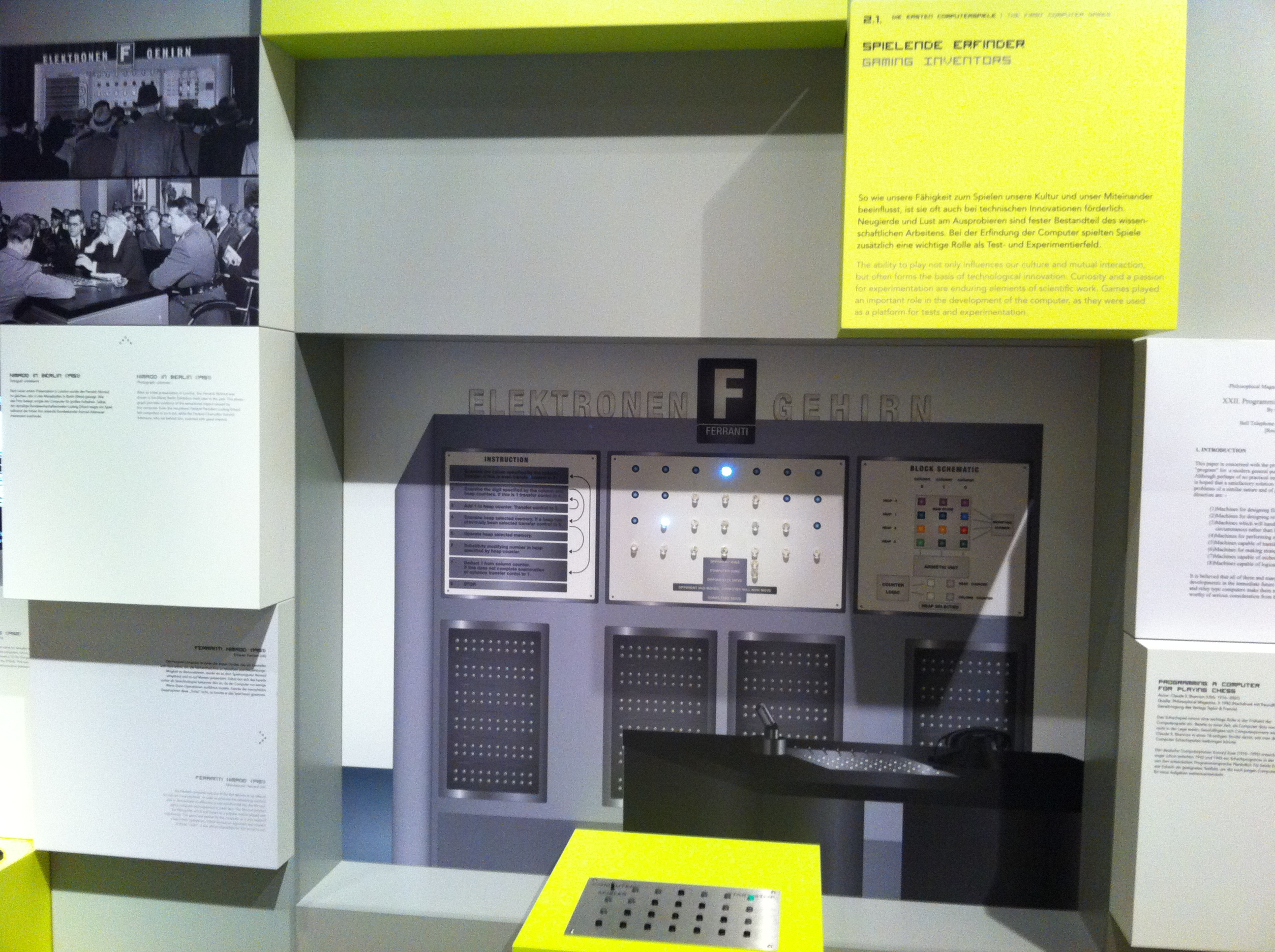
- Nimrod museum exhibit at the Computerspielemuseum Berlin
- Designers: John Makepeace Bennett; Raymond Stuart-Williams
- Platform: Computer game
- Release: May 5, 1951; 75 years ago
- Genre: Nim
- Mode: Single-player

The Nimrod, built in the United Kingdom by Ferranti for the 1951 Festival of Britain, was an early computer custom-built to play Nim, inspired by the earlier Nimatron. The twelve-by-nine-by-five-foot (3.7-by-2.7-by-1.5-meter) computer, designed by John Makepeace Bennett and built by engineer Raymond Stuart-Williams, allowed exhibition attendees to play a game of Nim against an artificial intelligence. The player pressed buttons on a raised panel corresponding with lights on the machine to select their moves, and the Nimrod moved afterward, with its calculations represented by more lights. The speed of the Nimrod's calculations could be reduced to allow the presenter to demonstrate exactly what the computer was doing, with more lights showing the state of the calculations. The Nimrod was intended to demonstrate Ferranti's computer design and programming skills rather than to entertain, though Festival attendees were more interested in playing the game than the logic behind it. After its initial exhibition in May, the Nimrod was shown for three weeks in October 1951 at the Berlin Industrial Show before being dismantled.

The game of Nim running on the Nimrod is a candidate for one of the first video games, as it was one of the first computer games to have any sort of visual display of the game. It appeared only four years after the 1947 invention of the cathode-ray tube amusement device, the earliest known interactive electronic game to use an electronic display, and one year after Bertie the Brain, a computer similar to the Nimrod which played tic-tac-toe at the 1950 Canadian National Exhibition. The Nimrod's use of light bulbs rather than a screen with real-time visual graphics, however, much less moving graphics, does not meet some definitions of a video game.

== Development ==
In the summer of 1951, the United Kingdom held the Festival of Britain, a national exhibition held throughout the UK to promote the British contribution to science, technology, industrial design, architecture, and the arts and to commemorate the centenary of the 1851 Great Exhibition. British engineering firm and nascent computer developer Ferranti promised to develop an exhibit for the Festival. In late 1950, John Makepeace Bennett, an Australian employee of the firm and recent Ph.D. graduate from the University of Cambridge, proposed that the company create a computer that could play the game of Nim. In Nim, players take turns removing at least one object from a set of objects, with the goal of being the player who removes the last object; gameplay options can be modeled mathematically. Bennett's suggestion was supposedly inspired by an earlier Nim-playing machine, "Nimatron", which had been displayed in 1940 at the New York World's Fair. The Nimatron machine had been designed by Edward Condon and constructed by Westinghouse Electric from electromechanical relays, and had weighed over a ton. Although Bennett's suggestion was a game, his goal was to show off the computer's ability to do mathematical calculations, as Nim is based on mathematical principles, and thus showcase Ferranti's computer design and programming skills rather than to entertain.

It may appear that, in trying to make machines play games, we are wasting our time. This is not true as the theory of games is extremely complex and a machine that can play a complex game can also be programmed to carry out very complex practical problems.

— Pamphlet accompanying the Nimrod sold to Festival of Britain attendees.

Ferranti began work on building the computer on 1 December 1950, with engineer Raymond Stuart-Williams adapting the design by Bennett into a working machine. Development was completed by 12 April 1951, resulting in a device twelve feet wide, nine feet deep, and five feet tall. The majority of the volume was taken up by vacuum tubes and the light bulbs that displayed the state of the game, with the actual computer taking up no more than two percent of the total volume of the machine. The Nimrod took the form of a large box with panels of lights, with a raised stand in front of it with buttons corresponding with the lights, which in turn represented the objects the player could remove.

The player would sit at the stand and press the buttons to make their moves, while one panel of lights showed the state of the game, and another showed the computer's calculations during its move. The computer could be set to make its calculations at various speeds, slowing down so that the demonstrator could describe exactly what the computer was doing in real time. A visual guide attached to the Nimrod explained what the computer was doing during its turn, as well as showing possible game states and how they would be represented by the lights. Signs stating which player's turn it was and whether one or the other had won would light up as appropriate during gameplay.

== Presentation ==
Diagram of the machine

On 5 May 1951, the Nimrod computer was presented at the Festival as the Nimrod Digital Computer, advertised as "faster than thought" and an "electronic brain". It exclusively played the game of Nim; moves were made by players seated at the raised stand, with the demonstrator sitting on the other side between the stand and the computer. Nimrod could play either the traditional or "reverse" form of the game. A short guidebook was sold to visitors for one shilling and sixpence explaining how computers worked, how the Nimrod worked, and advertising Ferranti's other developments. It explained that the use of a game to demonstrate the power of the machine did not mean that it was meant for entertainment and compared the mathematical underpinnings of Nim with modeling the economics of countries. Players of the Nimrod during the Festival included computer science pioneer Alan Turing.

Although it was intended as a technology demonstration, most of the onlookers at the Festival of Britain were more interested in playing the game than in the programming and engineering logic behind it. Bennett claimed that "most of the public were quite happy to gawk at the flashing lights and be impressed." BBC Radio journalist Paul Jennings claimed that all of the festival attendees "came to a standstill" upon reaching the "frightful" "tremendous gray refrigerator".

After the Festival, the Nimrod was showcased for three weeks in October at the Berlin Industrial Show, where it also drew crowds, including the West Germany economics minister Ludwig Erhard. It was then briefly shown in Toronto; afterwards, however, as it had served its purpose the Nimrod was dismantled. As the Nimrod was not intended as an entertainment product, it was not followed up by any future games, and Ferranti continued its work on designing general purpose computers. Nim was used as a demonstration program for several computers over the next few years, including the Norwegian NUSE (1954), Swedish SMIL (1956), Australian SILLIAC (1956), Polish Odra 1003 (Marienbad, 1962), Danish Nimbi (1963), and French Antinéa (1963).

The Nimrod was created only four years after the 1947 invention of the cathode-ray tube amusement device, the earliest known interactive electronic game, and one year after a similar purpose built game-playing machine, Bertie the Brain, the first computer-based game to feature a visual display of any sort. The Nimrod is considered under some definitions one of the first video games, possibly the second. While definitions vary, the prior cathode-ray tube amusement device was a purely analog electrical game, and while the Nimrod and Bertie did not feature an electronic screen they both had a game running on a computer. The software-based tic-tac-toe game OXO and a draughts program by Christopher Strachey were programmed a year later in 1952 and were the first computer games to display visuals on an electronic screen rather than through light bulbs.
