= Additron tube =

Electron tube

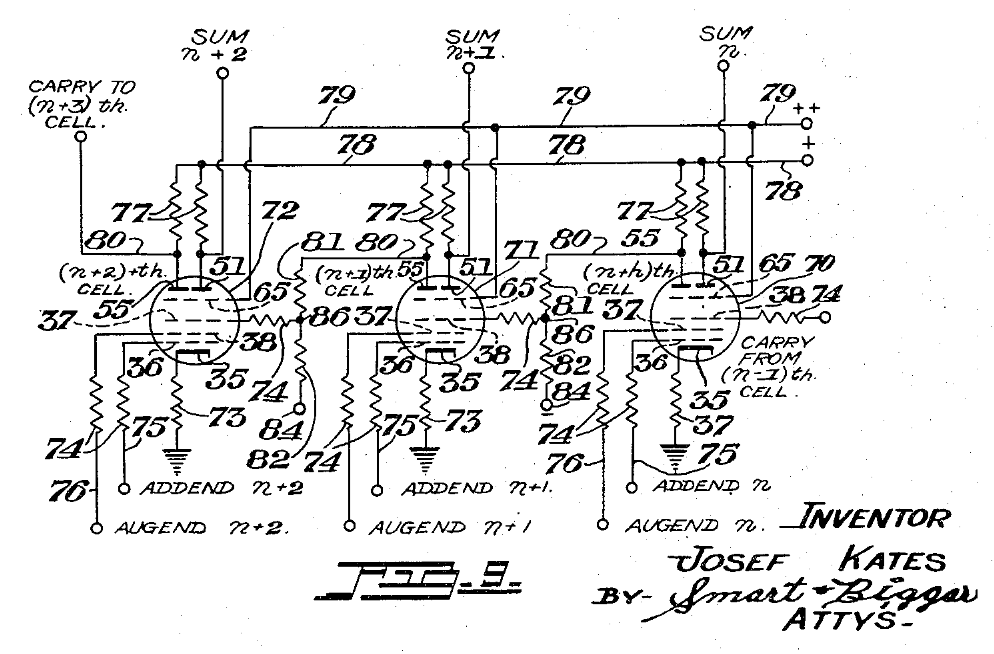
Schematic from U.S. patent 2,784,312 showing a 3-bit adder using Additron tubes

The Additron was an electron tube designed by Dr. Josef Kates, circa 1950, to replace the several individual electron tubes and support components required to perform the function of a single bit digital full adder. Dr. Kates developed the Additron with the intention of increasing the likelihood of success and reliability while reducing the size, power consumption and complexity of the University of Toronto Electronic Computer, (UTEC)

== Production ==
The Additron neither went into production at the Canadian Rogers Vacuum Tube Company, where the prototypes were built, nor was it used in the UTEC machine. It did make a widely publicized appearance at the 1950 Canadian National Exhibition operating an electronic game of Tic-Tac-Toe, dubbed Bertie the Brain, to show the marvels of electronic computing.

The tube was registered with the Radio Television Manufacturing Association on 20 March 1951 as type 6047.

== Patents ==
- U.S. patent 2,784,312
