= Josef Kates =

Canadian engineer

4th Chancellor of the University of Waterloo
- In office 1979–1985
- Preceded by: Carl Pollock
- Succeeded by: Sylvia Ostry
- President/Vice Chancellor: Burt Matthews (1979-1981); Douglas T. Wright (1981-1985)

Personal details
- Born: May 5, 1921 Vienna, Austria
- Died: June 16, 2018 (aged 97) Toronto, Ontario
- Education: Goethe-Realschule; McGill University; University of Toronto

Josef Kates, born Josef Katz, (May 5, 1921 – June 16, 2018) was a Canadian engineer whose achievements include designing the first digital game-playing machine, and the world's first automated traffic signalling system.

== Early life and education ==
Born the fifth of six children in an Austrian-Jewish family, Josef Kates was the son of Baruch (Bernard) and Anna Katz (née Entenberg). His parents ran a grocery store and an import-export business in Vienna. Kates fled to Italy to escape the Nazis after the Anschluss in 1938 and then, in 1939, joined the rest of his family which had fled to England. Kates enlisted in the British Army but, before he could see service, he and other Germans and Austrians resident in Britain were interned as enemy aliens. Kates was deported to Canada where he remained interned for almost two years until he and most of his fellow Jewish internees were recognised by the government as "victims of Nazi aggression" and released. At the camps in New Brunswick and Quebec, Kates fished, worked as a lumberjack, knitted socks and studied for his high school diploma through McGill University's high school matriculation program, placing first in Quebec's province-wide exams. After his release in 1942, he moved to Toronto where he met Lillian Kroch, marrying her in 1944. They had four children: Louis, Naomi, Celina and Philip A.

He was educated at Goethe-Realschule (Vienna: 1931–1938); McGill University (Montreal: 1941, junior and senior matriculation); University of Toronto (Toronto: 1944–1948, Honours in Mathematics and Physics; 1948-1949: M.A. in Applied Math; 1949-1951: Ph.D. in physics).

== Career ==
Kates started his career working for the Imperial Optical Company of Toronto in 1942, and was in charge of precision optics for Royal Canadian Navy equipment until he left in 1944. He then spent time working for Rogers Vacuum Tube Company, (now Royal Philips Electronics), for the next four years in the development and manufacturing of radar and radio tubes. He then began work in 1948 at the University of Toronto Computation Centre, where he participated in the design and building of UTEC, the first pilot model of a computer built in Canada.

Kates also built the first digital game playing machine, the 13-foot tall Bertie the Brain, which was exhibited at the 1950 Canadian National Exhibition. The game was a version of Tic-tac-toe, with adjustable difficulty levels. The game machine controlled the lighting of an overhead display to show the progress of the game, and was built using a special electron tube, the Additron Tube, which Kates had invented. The Additron Tube did the work of ten existing radio tubes, reducing the size and complexity of the machine. With the advent of transistors, which were much smaller and required less power, the tube was not put into commercial use.

Kates also designed Toronto's automated traffic signalling system in 1954 - the first in the world.

Kates founded and became the President of KCS Ltd in Toronto between 1954 and 1966, which merged with the consulting arm of Peat, Marwick, Mitchell & Co. to become Kates, Peat, Marwick & Co. in Canada, with other corporations in the US and the UK, for which he acted as a co-managing partner. He served as a computer consultant to many Canadian and American firms and organizations. He was involved in the creation of Setak Computer Services Corp. Ltd. (his last name spelled backwards) which was based in Toronto; it offered computer access and consulting based on Burroughs computers, e.g. the B5500. Setak's employee Barry W. Ramer later went on to found Barry W. Ramer & Partners Ltd. and Ramer Data Consulting Ltd. Management Consulting in Calgary Alberta. In 1974 he founded Josef Kates Associates Inc., for which he acted as president.

In 1968, he was appointed to the Science Council of Canada, and served as its chairman from 1975 to 1978. Kates was also chairman, CEO and director of Teleride Sage Ltd. (1977–1996), and IRD Teleride (1996–1997) followed until his retirement.

In 2014, at the age of 93, Kates designed a proposed improvement for Toronto Transit Commission subway system.

His wife, Lillian Kroch, died of cancer in 1993 after almost 50 years of marriage. In 1995, Kates married his second wife, Kay Hill. Kates died in Toronto on June 16, 2018.

== Honours ==
- Canadian Good Roads Association (now Transportation Association of Canada (1957: best paper)
- University of Waterloo (Waterloo: 1979–85, Chancellor; 1993: Chancellor Emeritus)
- LL.D. (Concordia University: 1981)
- Medal from the Engineering Institute of Canada (1970)
- Julian Smith Medal (1977)
- Engineering Institute of Canada (1990: Fellow)
- Canadian Association of Management Consultants (1994: Fellow)
- Doctor of Mathematics (DMath) (University of Waterloo) (2005)
- Member of the Order of Canada (2011)
- Intelligent Transportation systems association of Canada Lifetime achievement Award, 2013

== Organizations ==
- Mount Sinai Hospital (Toronto) (member of the Board of Governors)
- Technion University, Israel (member of the Canadian Board)
- Donalda Club (Toronto)
- Canadian Board of the Weizmann Institute (Israel)

== See also ==
- List of University of Waterloo people

Academic offices
Preceded by Carl Arthur Pollock	Chancellor of the University of Waterloo; 1979–1985	Succeeded by J. Page Wadsworth
