= Thomas T. Goldsmith Jr. =

American physics professor (1910–2009)

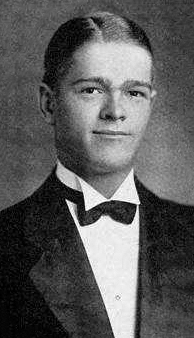
- University yearbook portrait, 1931
- Born: Thomas Toliver Goldsmith Jr. January 9, 1910; Greenville, South Carolina, U.S.
- Died: March 5, 2009 (aged 99); Lacey, Washington, U.S.
- Education: Cornell University; Furman University
- Known for: Cathode-ray tube amusement device
- Spouse: Helen Wilcox
- Scientific career
- Fields: Physics
- Workplaces: Furman University; DuMont Laboratories
- Doctoral advisor: Frederick Bidell

Thomas Toliver Goldsmith Jr. (January 9, 1910 – March 5, 2009) was an American television pioneer, the co-inventor of the cathode-ray tube amusement device, and a professor of physics at Furman University.

== Biography ==
Goldsmith was born in Greenville, South Carolina, on January 9, 1910. His parents were Thomas and Charlotte Goldsmith, a real estate broker and concert pianist respectively. As a teenager, he built crystal radio sets, and continued his interest in engineering as a graduate of Furman University in Greenville. He received his B.S. at Furman University in Greenville in 1931, in physics, and his Ph.D. from Cornell University in 1936 building an oscilloscope for his doctoral research, under the supervision of Dr. Frederick Bidell. After graduating from Cornell, became director of research for DuMont Laboratories in New Jersey, and (after 1953) vice president; he chaired the Synchronization Panel of the National Television System Committee and also the Radio Manufacturers Association Committee on Cathode-Ray Tubes. He also became the chief engineer for the DuMont-affiliated television station WTTG in Washington, DC, which is named for him: his initials are the basis of its call sign. In 1966 he left DuMont to become a professor of physics at Furman, and he retired to become an emeritus professor in 1975.

Goldsmith died on March 5, 2009, in Lacey, Washington at the age of 99 due to a hip fracture leading to infection. Goldsmith was married to Helen Wilcox (November 16, 1910 – June 7, 2009) before 1940. They raised three children. Helen died three months after her husband.

== First arcade game with a CRT ==
Goldsmith in 1984

U.S. patent 2,455,992, filed by Goldsmith and Estle Ray Mann on January 25, 1947, describes the world's first cathode ray tube based game, the "Cathode-ray tube amusement device". It was inspired by the radar displays used in World War II. Goldsmith and Mann were granted their patent on December 14, 1948, making it the first ever patent for an electronic game. Entitled "Cathode Ray Tube Amusement Device", the patent describes a game in which a player controls the CRT's electron gun much like an Etch A Sketch. The beam from the gun is focused at a single point on the screen to form a dot representing a missile, and the player tries to control the dot to hit paper targets put on the screen, with all hits detected mechanically. By connecting a cathode ray tube to an oscilloscope and devising knobs that controlled the angle and trajectory of the light traces displayed on the oscilloscope, they were able to invent a missile game that, when using screen overlays, created the effect of firing missiles at various targets. To make the game more challenging, its circuits can alter the player's ability to aim the dot. However, due to the equipment costs and various circumstances, the Cathode-Ray Tube Amusement Device was never sold. Only handmade prototypes were ever created.

== Awards and honors ==
Goldsmith was awarded five patents essential to the improvement of television production and broadcasting. Goldsmith was a Life Fellow of the Society of Motion Picture and Television Engineers. In 1949, he won an Institute of Radio Engineers Award "For his contributions in the development of cathode-ray instrumentation and in the field of television." In 1979, the Radio Club of America honored Goldsmith with the first Allen B. DuMont Citation for "important contributions in the field of electronics to the science of television". In 1999, Goldsmith won the first Dr. Charles Townes Individual Achievement Award as part of the Innovision Technology Awards competition honoring innovation in the upstate South Carolina area. A comprehensive collection of artifacts and ephemera of his life and his inventions is housed in the Library of Congress. In 1967, he was selected as an honorary member of Phi Mu Alpha Sinfonia, the national men's music fraternity, by Furman University's Gamma Eta chapter, which confers an annual award, in Goldsmith's honor, to the university's rising senior non-music major student who does the most to advance music in America.
