= Gun Game =

Video game mode

Gun Game is a multiplayer video game mode first introduced as a Counter-Strike mod. It was later adapted in other first-person shooters, and became an official mode of the same name in the Call of Duty series; Counter-Strike: Global Offensive and Counter-Strike 2 (under the name "Arms Race"); and Valorant (under the name "Escalation"), among other games. A single-player adaptation of Gun Game with close-combat weapons was modded into Dark Souls. The mode is a form of deathmatch or team deathmatch in which players attempt to kill random opponents, but with the added twist that each time the player scores a kill, their gun is immediately replaced with a more powerful one, cycling through the game's entire arsenal from weakest to strongest. The mode has been praised by critics as enjoyable and increasing the appeal of games that contain it due to the brevity of each Gun Game round, though it is noted to suffer more than typical game modes from players who AFK, becoming easy targets and potentially stacking the game towards otherwise worse players.

== Description ==
At the beginning of a Gun Game round, all players start with an equally weak weapon. Defeating an enemy causes the player's gun to increase in tier, while a player who is killed has their progress reset when they respawn. Later guns are usually stronger, but may be harder to use, such as sniper rifles. Reaching the highest tier causes the player's gun to be replaced with a combat knife; scoring a kill with the knife causes that player to win, and the entire game to restart. The arenas used for the mode are typically small and symmetrical, so neither side has an advantage.

== Reception ==
Ben Kidson of PCGamesN praised the addition of Arms Race to Counter-Strike: Global Offensive, describing default Counter-Strike as a "long slog" and saying that Gun Game was different due to the near-immediate respawn of the player as opposed to the typical permadeath. Also commenting on the game's lack of gun purchasing, he called it "oddly liberating". Craig Pearson of Rock Paper Shotgun described Arms Race as "if someone accidentally tumble-dried Counter-Strike". Wesley Yin-Poole of Eurogamer described Call of Duty: WWII's version of Gun Game as "especially awesome", but noted that it had a major problem with AFK players, who are encouraged to "play" through as many rounds as possible as part of the game's Special Order incentives and find Gun Game the quickest way to do so, calling on the game's developers to punish such players. Imogen Beckhelling, also of Rock Paper Shotgun, called Valorant's Escalation mode "exactly the sort of game I crave inbetween the usual tense shoot-outs", noting that it not only included the game's typical weapons, but also randomized special abilities various agents were able to use, describing the result as "brilliant chaos" and "fab", but wanting it to be even more chaotic. The Gun Game of Call of Duty: Black Ops Cold War was described by Jeremy Peel of PC Gamer as "a mode that might be older than some of Cold War's players", with "a challenging curve" due to the later guns being sniper rifles, but resulting in "one of the finest highs" in the game when the player wins. Edwin Evans-Thirlwell, also from Rock Paper Shotgun, said that Gun Game was the "bestest-best game mode".

== Legacy ==
Dark Souls received a Gun Game mod without the actual guns, which gives the player XP whenever they attack an enemy, leveling up their weapon as long as their character does not die. It also includes special bonus weapon drops from defeating bosses.
