= John Makepeace Bennett =

Australian computer scientist

Emeritus Professor John Makepeace Bennett AO FTSE
- Born: 31 July 1921; Warwick, Queensland, Australia
- Died: 9 December 2010 (aged 89); Sydney, NSW, Australia
- Education: University of Queensland, University of Cambridge
- Awards: Officer of the Order of Australia (AO)
- Scientific career
- Fields: computer science
- Workplaces: Ferranti, Sydney University

John Makepeace Bennett AO FTSE (31 July 1921 – 9 December 2010) was an early Australian computer scientist. He was Australia's first professor of computer science and the founding president of the Australian Computer Society. His pioneering career included work on early computers such as EDSAC, Ferranti Mark 1* and SILLIAC, and spreading the word about the use of computers through computing courses and computing associations.

== Personal life ==
Bennett was born in 1921 at Warwick, Queensland, the son of Albert John Bennett and Elsie Winifred née Bourne.

In 1952 he married Rosalind Mary Elkington (who was also working at Ferranti). They had four children: Christopher John, Ann Margaret, Susan Elizabeth and Jane Mary.

In 1986 Bennett, aged 65, retired with his wife to Sydney's Northern Beaches. Bennett died at home on 9 December 2010 and was survived by his wife, four children and six grandchildren.

== Education and war service ==
Bennett was educated at The Southport School. After which, he went to the University of Queensland to study civil engineering.

From 1942 until 1946 (during WWII), he served in the RAAF. He worked on a radar unit on the Wessel Islands and later worked in airfield construction. He then returned to the University of Queensland to study electrical and mechanical engineering and mathematics.

== Professional life ==
In 1947 he went to Cambridge University to become Maurice Vincent Wilkes' first research assistant as part of the team working to build EDSAC. This was the world's first practical stored program electronic computer, and the world's first computer in regular operation from 1949. He used EDSAC to carry out the first ever structural engineering calculations on a computer as part of his PhD.

He worked for Ferranti in Manchester and London as a computer specialist. Here he designed the instruction set for Ferranti Mark 1*, which was the main improvement of that machine over Ferranti Mark 1.

In 1956, Bennett returned to Australia to become numerical analyst (and later senior numerical analyst) to the Adolph Basser Laboratory at the University of Sydney. His main work was the development of software for SILLIAC.

Until 1958 he taught associated courses in the use of computers. In 1958 he established a postgraduate diploma in numerical analysis and computing which was later changed to the postgraduate diploma in computer science.

In 1961, the Basser Laboratory became the Basser Computing Department and John Bennet became professor of physics (electronic computing). In 1972 the Basser Computing Department was split into the Basser Department of Computer Science (for teaching and research) and the University Computer Centre. John Bennett was appointed head of the new Basser Department of Computer Science, but it was not until 1982 that John Bennett's title was changed to be Professor of Computer Science - a title which he held until his retirement in 1987.

He was also the foundation chairman of the Australian Committee on Computation and Automatic Control from 1959 to 1963, the president of the New South Wales Computer Society from 1965 to 1966, and the foundation president of the Australian Computer Society from 1966 to 1967. In 1981 he helped found the Research Foundation for Information Technology at the university.

== Awards ==
In 1983 he was appointed an Officer of the Order of Australia (AO) for service to computing science.

In 2001 he was awarded the Centenary Medal for service to Australian society in computer science and technology.

In 2004 Bennett was awarded the Pearcey Medal, an annual award presented to a distinguished Australian for a lifetime and outstanding contribution to the ICT industry.
