= Rogers Vacuum Tube Company =

Canadian vacuum tube manufacturer

Rogers Vacuum Tube Company (formally named Radio Manufacturing Corporation Limited) was founded as the Standard Radio Manufacturing Corporation in 1925 by Edward Rogers (1900–1939) to sell Rogers "Batteryless" radios using vacuum tube technology. It was later renamed Rogers Majestic Corporation Limited when Rogers merged his company with Majestic Corporation of Chicago in 1928. The new company controlled Rogers Radio Tube Company and Rogers Batteryless Radio Company. Joseph Elsworth Rogers (1898–1960), brother of Edward Rogers, was an important member of the company and served as vice-president until 1939, and then as head from 1939 to 1960.

The company founded Toronto AM radio station CFRB in order to promote its invention of a batteryless radio receiver, as well as demonstrate the invention of a radio transmitter using batteryless alternating current tubes, making CFRB the first all-mains-electric radio station in the world. Edward Rogers died in 1939, and the company was sold in 1941 to Small Electric Motors Ltd. (that became the Canadian division of Dutch giant Royal Philips Electronics), which changed the name of the Rogers Majestic Corporation Limited to Standard Radio Ltd.

== Vacuum tubes using alternating current ==
In 1924, Edward Rogers formed Rogers Radio Ltd of Toronto to manufacture radios. While visiting the United States, he witnessed an experimental tube operating using AC current demonstrated by Frederick S. McCullough. The demonstration proved that an AC operated vacuum tube was feasible, but it exhibited too much hum, due to the filament cycling at the generator frequency. Returning to Canada, Rogers experimented with ways to reduce this hum by redesigning the filament and successfully demonstrating the hum reduction in the fall of 1924.

The Standard Radio Manufacturing Corporation was formed in 1925 to mass-produce this new AC operated vacuum tube. Rogers produced and marketed one of the first Canadian and United States AC operated triode vacuum tubes with the production of the Rogers R30 and R32. RCA would market the UX-226 AC triode in September 1926.

In 1928, Rogers changed the name from Standard Radio Manufacturing to the Rogers Radio Tube Company Ltd. Rogers by this time had put more emphasis in vacuum tube development and manufacturing over the manufacture and selling of radio sets. During this period, Rogers was in full production of AC operated tetrode tubes similar to the RCA UY-224.

== See also ==
- Additron tube
- Rogers Communications, a broadcasting and media company established by Ted Rogers (the only child of Edward Rogers)
