= Nimatron =

1940 electro-mechanical game

- Nimatron in 1940
- Developer: Edward Condon; Gerald L. Tawney; Willard A. Derr
- Manufacturer: Westinghouse Electric Corporation
- Released: April 1940

The Nimatron was an electro-mechanical machine that played Nim. It was first exhibited in April–October 1940 by the Westinghouse Electric Corporation at the 1939-1940 New York World's Fair to entertain fair-goers. Conceived some months prior by Edward Condon and built by Gerald L. Tawney and Willard A. Derr, the device was composed of electro-mechanical relays which could respond to players' choices in the game in a dozen different patterns, and had elements of early non-programmable digital computers. The machine, which weighed over a metric ton, displayed four lines of seven light bulbs both in front of the player and on four sides of an overhead cube. Players alternated turns with the machine in removing one or more lights from one of the rows until the lights were all extinguished. The calculations were purposely delayed to give the illusion that the machine was considering moves, and winners received a token.

The reception of the machine during the fair was positive, with around 100,000 games of Nim played. After the fair it was moved to the Buhl Planetarium and Institute of Popular Science Building in Pittsburgh. Despite this success, Condon considered the Nimatron a failure, because he had designed and intended it to be solely a piece of entertainment for fair-goers, but within years of the exhibition programmable digital computers began to be produced around the world by other companies and groups that used some of the same principles around storing digital information. The Nimatron is considered one of the first electro-mechanical games and a precursor to the video game, but its direct impact on the early history of video games and beyond is minimal. It may, however, have inspired the Nimrod computer, which was demonstrated at the 1951 Festival of Britain playing Nim using banks of lightbulbs like the Nimatron eleven years prior.

== Development ==
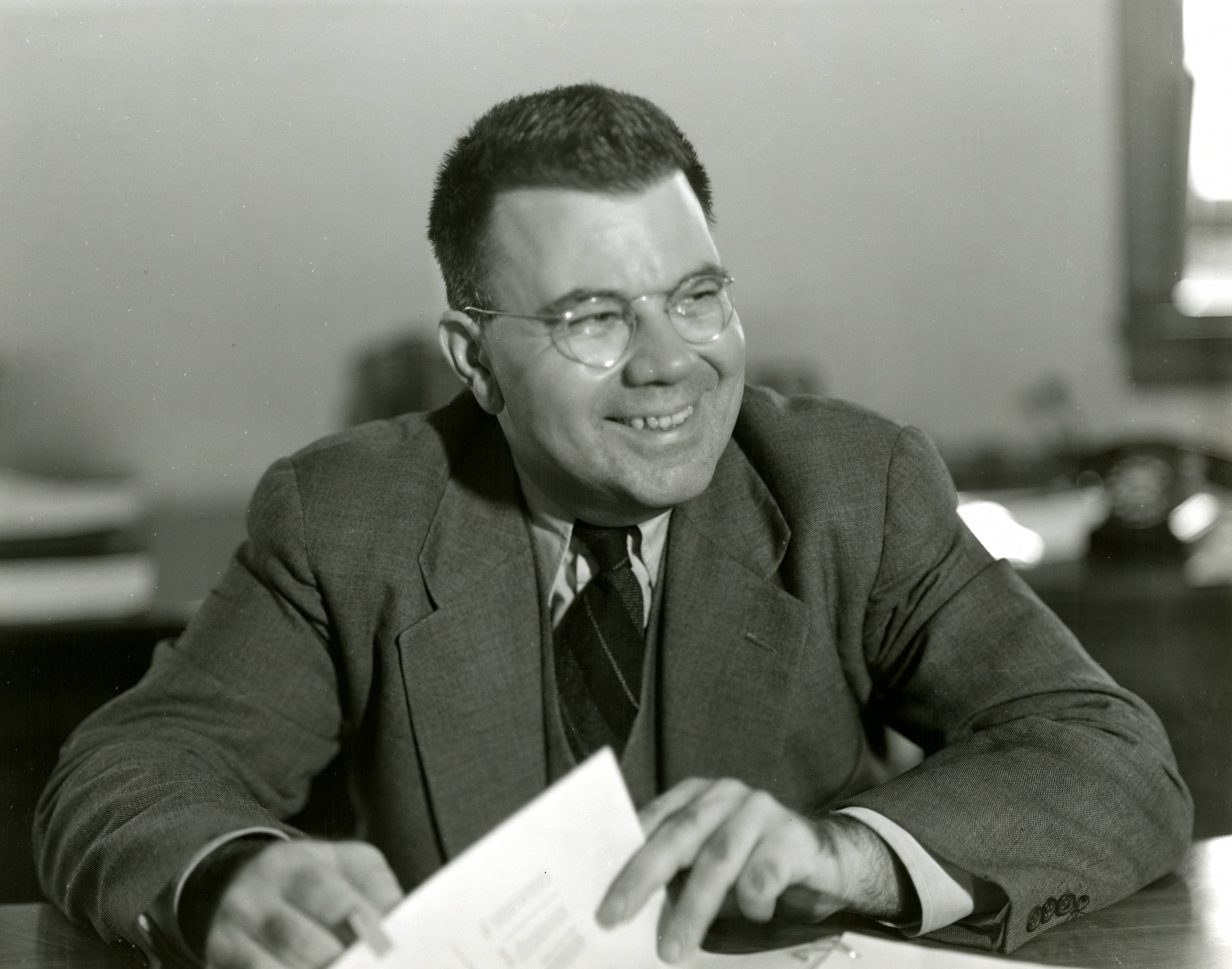
Edward Condon, the inventor of the Nimatron

The 1939 New York World's Fair was held in April—October 1939 and April—October 1940, featuring exhibits from countries and companies worldwide. A major exhibitor was the Westinghouse Electric Corporation, and during the break in the fair it was looking for new exhibits to add for the second season. Edward Condon, a nuclear physicist and pioneer of quantum mechanics and an associate director of research at the company, proposed making a machine that could play Nim. In Nim, players take turns removing at least one object from a set of objects, with the goal of being the player who removes the last object; gameplay options can be modeled mathematically. In the version of the game Condon proposed using, there are multiple sets of objects, and on each turn the player can only remove objects from a single set. Condon, who claims to have come up with the idea while talking to another employee on his lunch break, knew that mathematically the model could be expressed with the same binary notation that was used in the circuits for Geiger counters. The proposal was not intended to showcase any particular technology, but only to serve as entertainment for the fair-goers. The result, named Nimatron, was an electro-mechanical machine with elements of early non-programmable digital computers, as it could retain the state of the game in binary and respond according to which mechanical switches were flipped, though no changes could be made without physically modifying the machine.

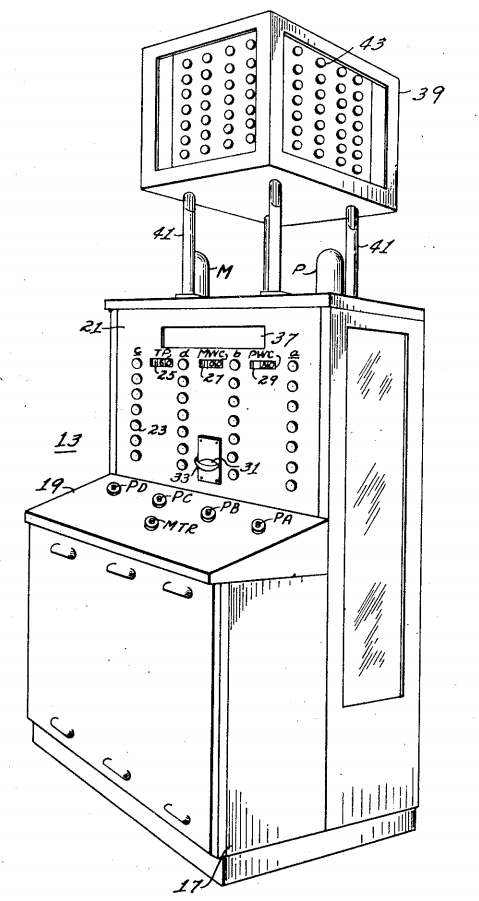
Drawing of the Nimatron from patent application

The machine itself was designed and built by Gerald L. Tawney and Willard A. Derr, who worked in the relay division of Westinghouse. Although electronic vacuum tubes were faster than electro-mechanical relays at processing information, the machine was designed and built with electro-mechanical relays as vacuum tubes were less robust and speed was not an issue. Even with relays, the machine was considered too fast; it could still make its turn in milliseconds as opposed to the microseconds it would have taken with vacuum tubes, which was felt to be demoralizing to players. The team added a delay relay to the game of a couple seconds to make it appear that the machine was thinking about the move to make instead of the physical algorithm nearly instantly responding. The state of the game was represented with four columns of seven lights; on the player's turn they decided on a column to take lights from and pressed a button one or more times to turn out lights in that column, then pressed another to give the machine a turn. The set of lights were displayed on the front of the machine, as well as on four sides of a cube above the machine to allow spectators to follow the game. If the player won, the machine produced a token with the inscription "Nim Champ". The machine, described by Popular Mechanics as having 116 relays and over two miles of copper wire, and by The New York Times as being a robot eight feet tall and three feet wide, encased in a metal box, weighed over a metric ton. Westinghouse, on behalf of Condon, Tawney, and Derr, filed a patent application with the United States on April 26, 1940, and obtained it on September 24, 1940.

== Presentation ==
"Nim Champ" Token
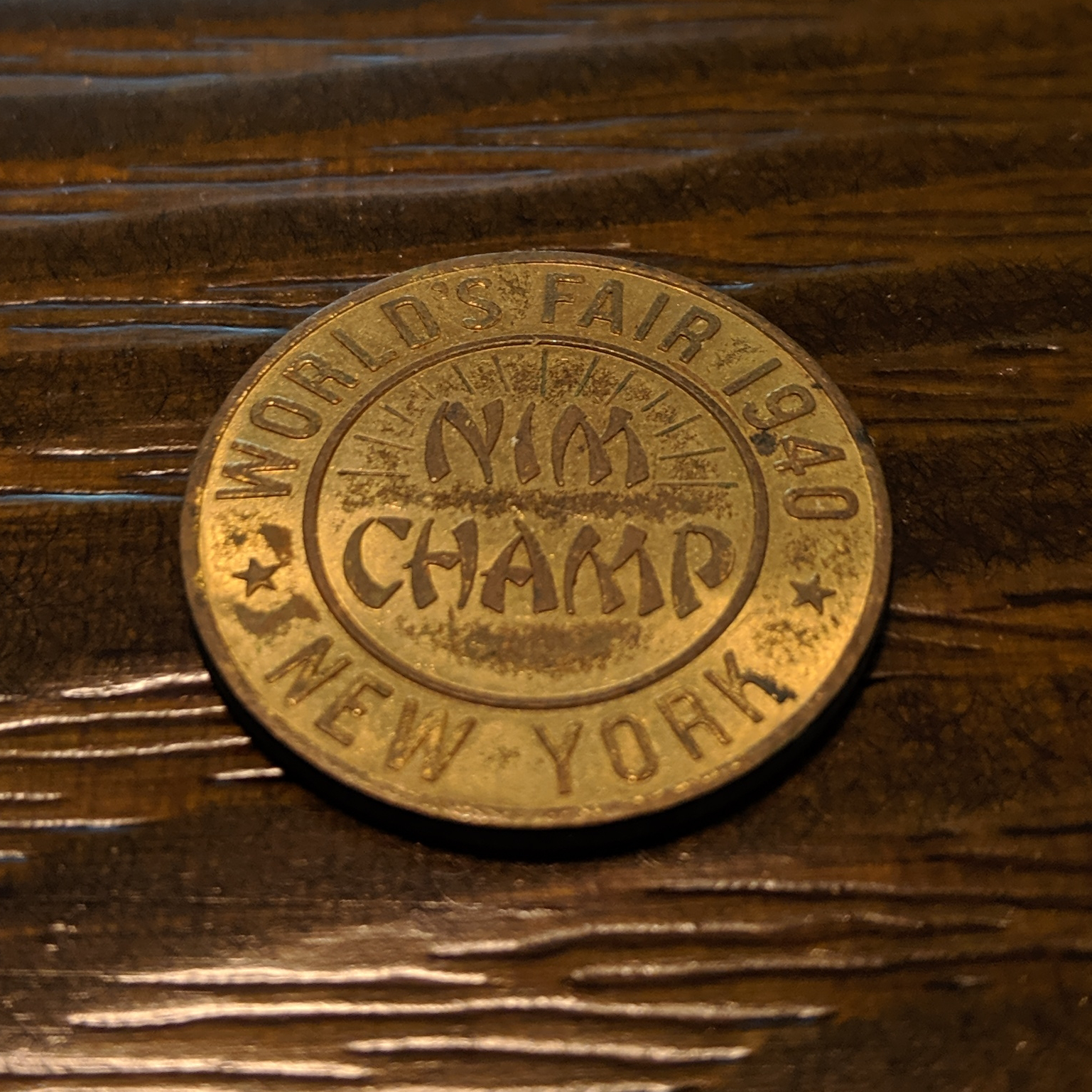

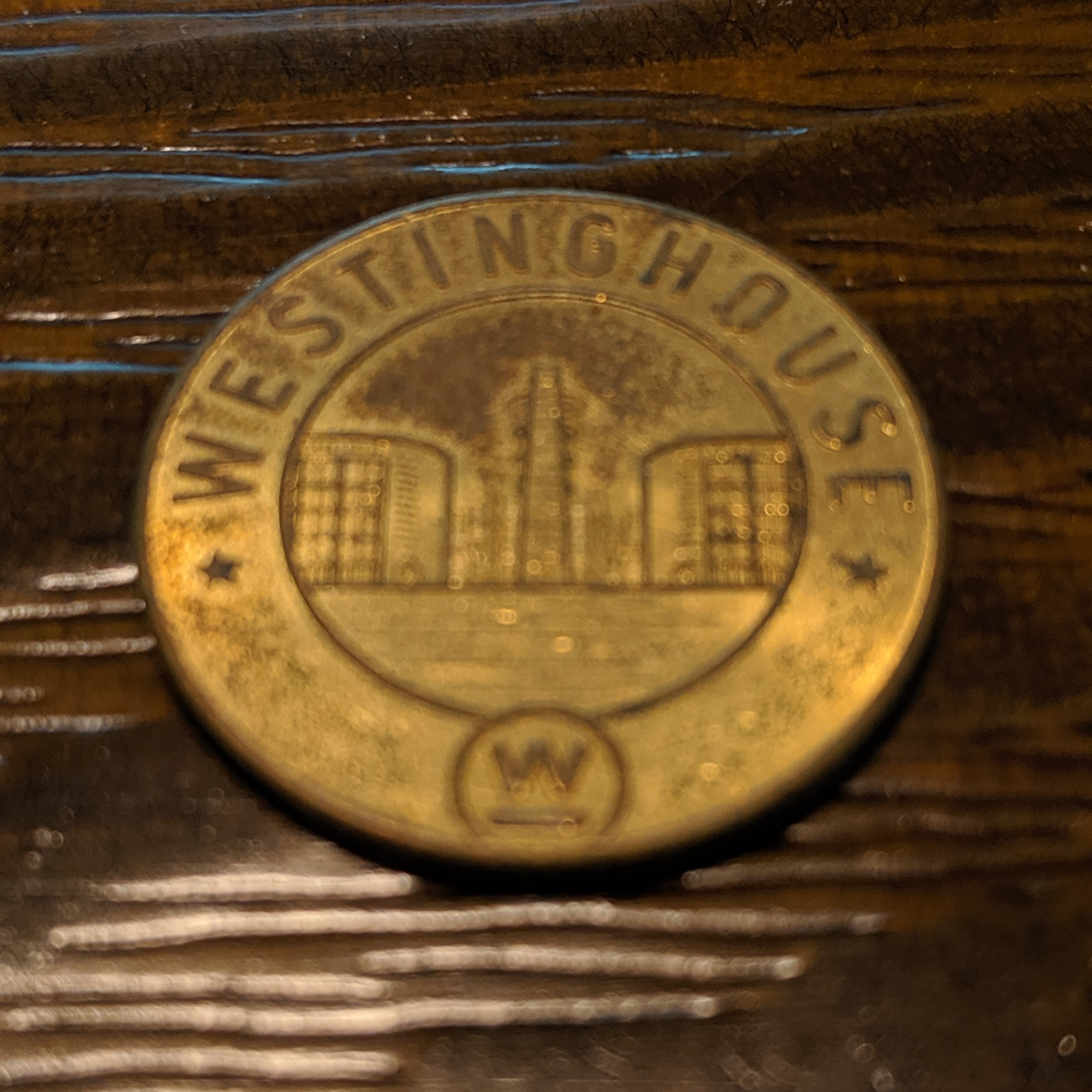

The Nimatron was exhibited in the second half of the New York World's Fair in 1940. The game was a success with fair-goers, with Condon later stating that it was played over 100,000 times. The machine included counters for how many times it was played and how many times the player had won, with the Nimatron winning 90,000 times. This count was skewed, however, by the operators of the machine; although it appeared complicated, the machine could only play the game in a dozen or so preset patterns, meaning that the operators could learn the patterns and beat the machine at any time in order to demonstrate the fair-goers that it could be done. As its creators intended, the Nimatron was not viewed as a technological advancement but as an entertaining amusement; in an account of the fair, The New York Times placed it under a "novelty" subheading along with the exhibit of Elsie the Cow, the advertising icon of Borden.

== Legacy ==
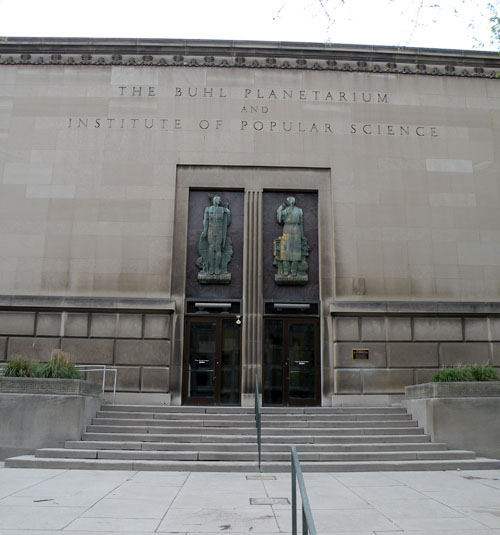
The Buhl Planetarium and Institute of Popular Science Building

After the fair, the Nimatron was kept for some period of time at the Buhl Planetarium and Institute of Popular Science Building in Pittsburgh. The last known time it was presented outside the institute was in 1941 at a convention of the Allied Social Science Associations in New York City, with its exhibition sponsored by the American Statistical Association and the Institute of Mathematical Statistics. It is unknown how long it stayed on display, though as late as 1951 it was reported to still be present at the institute.

The Nimatron was the first computing device dedicated solely to gaming. Condon claimed in an article for The American Mathematical Monthly in 1942 that "The Nimatron serves no other useful purpose than to entertain, unless it be to illustrate how a set of electrical relays can be made to make a 'decision' in accordance with a fairly simple mathematical procedure." A similar, much smaller Nim-playing device was described in The American Mathematical Monthly in 1948 using different types of circuits, and was explicitly compared by the authors to the Nimatron. Despite the success of the Nimatron at the World's Fair, Condon later considered the machine as a failure because he had viewed it solely as an entertaining device without practical application and did not pursue anything further with the concept, but within years fully-programmable digital computers began to be created by other companies and groups using some of the same principles for storing and handling digital numbers. One such digital general-purpose computer was the Nimrod, which was demonstrated at the 1951 Festival of Britain running a program to play Nim using banks of lightbulbs as the output, and which may have been potentially inspired by the Nimatron.

== Sources ==
- Donovan, Tristan (2010). Replay: The History of Video Games. Yellow Ant. ISBN 978-0-9565072-0-4.
- Peddie, Jon (2013). The History of Visual Magic in Computers: How Beautiful Pictures Are Made in CAD, 3D, VR and AR. Springer London. ISBN 978-1-4471-4931-6.
- Rougetet, Lisa (2017). "Machines Designed to Play Nim Games (1940–1970): A Possible (Re)Use in the Modern French Mathematics Curriculum". In Hart, Eric W.; Sandefur, James (eds.). Teaching and Learning Discrete Mathematics Worldwide: Curriculum and Research. Springer International Publishing. ISBN 978-3-319-70308-4.
- Smith, Alexander (2019). They Create Worlds: The Story of the People and Companies That Shaped the Video Game Industry, Vol. I: 1971-1982. CRC Press. ISBN 978-0-429-75261-2.
