= UTEC =

Early Canadian computer

- R.J. Johnston, Josef Kates and Leonard Casciato with UTEC c. 1950
- Also known as: UTEC Mark I
- Developer: University of Toronto
- Type: Digital computer
- Released: October 1, 1951
- Units shipped: 1

UTEC (University of Toronto Electronic Computer), also known as UTEC Mark I, was an early computer built at the University of Toronto (U of T) in the early 1950s. It was the first computer in Canada and one of the first working electronic computers in the world, although only built in a prototype form while awaiting funding for expansion into a full-scale version. This funding was eventually used to purchase a surplus Manchester Mark 1 from Ferranti in the UK instead, and UTEC quickly disappeared.

== Background ==
Immediately after the end of World War II several members of the U of T staff met informally as the Committee on Computing Machines to discuss their computation needs over the next few years. In 1946 a small $1,000 grant was used to send one of the group's members to tour several US research labs to see their progress on computers and try to see what was possible given U of T's likely funding. Due to U of T's preeminent position in the Canadian research world, the tour was also followed by members of the Canadian Research Council.

In January 1947 the committee delivered a report suggesting the creation of a formal Computing Center, primarily as a service bureau to provide computing services both to the university and commercial interests, as well as the nucleus of a research group into computing machinery. Specifically they recommended the immediate renting of an IBM mechanical punched card-based calculator, building a simple differential analyzer, and the eventual purchase or construction of an electronic computer. The report noted that funding should be expected from both the National Research Council (NRC) and the Defense Research Board (DRB).

The DRB soon provided a grant of $6,500 to set up the Computation Center, with the Committee eventually selecting Kelly Gotlieb to run it. Additional funding followed in February 1948 with a $20,000 a year grant from a combined pool set up by the DRB and NRC. Although this was less than was hoped for, the IBM machinery was soon in place and being used to calculate several tables for Atomic Energy of Canada Limited (AECL). Additionally a small version of the differential analyzer was completed by September 1948, although it appears to have seen little use.

Preliminary work on an electronic computer also started about the same time with some experimental work in various circuit designs. However they also felt that in order to get a machine working quickly, a fully electronic design was simply too state of the art and had significant risk. Instead they considered building a copy of Bell Labs' Model 6 relay-based machine, which they had seen earlier. However, when they finally decided to go ahead with the project in August 1948, Northern Electric (Bell's arm in Canada) informed them they would charge $25,000 ($347881 in 2025) to license the Model 6 design.

At a meeting with the NRC in March 1949, the NRC turned down their request for additional funding for the license, and instead suggested that the Center invest in a fully electronic computer, upping the yearly grants to $50,000 to that end. This turned out to be a major success - relay based computers quickly disappeared, and electronic systems proved themselves quickly.

== UTEC ==
Beatrice Helen Worsley and Perham Stanley, two graduate students working at the Computation Center, were sent to Cambridge University to work with Maurice Wilkes who was in the process of completing the EDSAC. Worsley wrote the program that generated a table of squares, the first program to successfully run on EDSAC.

Another two graduate students, Alf Ratz and Josef Kates had been studying circuitry for some time by this point, and turned their attention to computer memory systems. Their first attempts were with a novel system based on neon tubes, but a 1949 visit by Freddie Williams led to them abandoning this work and moving to Williams tubes instead.

Given the current level of funding a full-scale machine was not possible, so it was decided to build a smaller machine to test out the various components. Williams tubes would store 256 12-bit words, with instructions using 3-bits of a word leaving 9-bits for addressing (allowing up to 512 words of memory).

Parts of the machine were up and running quickly, with the math and logic units (the arithmetic logic unit in modern terminology) running by the autumn of 1950. Memory reliability proved to be a serious problem, as it was for all systems using the Williams tube concept, but Katz introduced shielding that improved things somewhat. The machine was declared fully operational on October 1, 1951.

Over the next few months major efforts were made to increase reliability, as well as add a second bank of memory to bring it to the full 512 words. Libraries added math functions for 12-, 24-, 36- and 48-bit math. A basic 12-bit addition took about 240 microseconds, multiplication about 18 milliseconds.

With the basic system up and running, attention turned to a "full sized" version. This machine would use a 44-bit word with 1,024 words of memory backed up with a 10,000 word magnetic drum to be supplied by Ferranti Canada. A new math unit would operate on an entire word in parallel, instead of bit-serial as with most machines of the era, dramatically improving performance so that an addition would take only 20 microseconds and a multiply about 200—faster than the prototype at addition even on its much smaller word size.

Success of the UTEC created intense demand within the Canadian research establishment to start construction of the full scale follow-on. The funding pool was increased to $300,000 to cover development and construction.

== FERUT ==
Console of the FERUT computer at the University of Toronto

FERUT telegraph connection to the University of Saskatchewan

While UTEC was being built, a similar machine was under construction at Manchester University, known as the "Baby". Once it started working the university signed an agreement with Ferranti (in the UK) to build a full-scale machine eventually known as the Mark I. The new machine was delivered to the university in February 1951, making it the first commercial computer, about one month earlier than the UNIVAC I was handed over to the US Census Bureau.

Ferranti had high hopes for further sales of the machine, and were happy when an order was placed by the British Atomic Energy Authority for delivery in autumn of 1952. However the government changed hands while the machine was being built, and all government contracts over £100,000 were cancelled outright. This left a partially completed Mark I sitting at Ferranti, who became interested in unloading it as soon as possible.

Word of the machine quickly reached the AECL, who suggested that they use the $300,000 set aside for the "new" UTEC to purchase the Mark I instead. The Computation Center considered the Mark I to be inferior to their own design and rejected it, notably because it used a serial math unit like their prototype and would thus be much slower.

The AECL was not terribly impressed but came up with a solution; if the Computation Center would buy the Mark I, another $150,000 would be made available to continue development of the UTEC, and an equal amount if they decided to actually build it. This sort of deal one does not refuse, and plans to ship the Mark I to Toronto were soon underway.

The machine arrived on April 30, 1952, at the time it was major news. Named Ferut (Ferranti, University of Toronto) by Worsley shortly before it arrived, it took the Ferranti engineers several months to set it up. Even then it became one of the first "large" machines to start operation in North America. Ferut would go on to be a major research system in Canada, being used by Ontario Hydro to calculate changes in water levels due to the opening of the St. Lawrence Seaway, various development of the groundbreaking ReserVec system with Ferranti Canada for Trans Canada Airlines, and even rental of time for commercial seismic data processing.

The arrival of the Ferut also spelled the death of the UTEC project. Even with the additional funding, most of the engineers quickly drifted to the Ferut machine.
