= Starship Troopers: Ultimate Bug War! =

- Cover art
- Developer: Auroch Digital
- Publisher: Dotemu
- Platforms: Nintendo Switch 2 PlayStation 5 Windows; Xbox Series X/S
- Release: 16 March 2026
- Genre: First-person shooter
- Mode: Single-player

Starship Troopers: Ultimate Bug War! is a 2026 retro first-person shooter video game. It was developed by Auroch Digital and published by Dotemu. The game was released for Nintendo Switch 2, PlayStation 5, Windows and Xbox Series X/S on 16 March 2026. It received mixed reviews from critics.

== Development ==
Starship Troopers: Ultimate Bug War! was developed by Auroch Digital, a British game developer responsible for Brewmaster and Mars Horizon, and known for its partnership with Games Workshop. In 2023, Auroch Digital’s boomer shooter, Warhammer 40,000: Boltgun, was released to generally favourable reviews for Windows and Xbox Series X, while reviews for PlayStation 5 and Nintendo Switch were mixed. Starship Troopers: Ultimate Bug War!, developed after Warhammer 40,000: Boltgun, was also conceived as a boomer shooter, with low-polygon graphics stylistically influenced by games from the 1990s, and a focus on action.

The game is set in the world of Starship Troopers, Paul Verhoeven’s 1997 film, which was based on the 1959 novel written by Robert A. Heinlein. In the game, Casper Van Dien reprises his role from the film as Johnny Rico.

According to producer Anthony “Ant” O’Neill, publisher Dotemu acquired the IP for Starship Troopers from Sony Pictures and aimed for a “retro-esque” first-person shooter, similar to Auroch Digital’s work on Warhammer 40,000: Boltgun.

== Reception ==
Reception

Aggregate scores
Aggregator	Score
Metacritic	(PC) 73/100 (XSXS) 78/100 (PS5) 71/100 (NS2) 73/100
OpenCritic	62% recommend (Note: Based on 52 reviews)

The Xbox Series X version of Starship Troopers: Ultimate Bug War! received generally favorable reviews from critics, while the PC, PlayStation 5, and Nintendo Switch 2 versions of the game all received "mixed or average" reviews from critics, according to the review aggregation website Metacritic. Fellow review aggregator OpenCritic assessed that the game received fair approval, being recommended by 62% of critics.

In a positive review for Nintendo Life, Ken Talbot stated that, "Playing as a Trooper or a Bug in this stylised retro shooter is every bit as entertaining as the movie that inspired it, with a bonus hit of nostalgia for fans of golden-era military shooters." Talbot, however, criticised the lack of a multiplayer mode.

Benjamin Jakobs, reviewing the Xbox Series X version of the game for Eurogamer Germany, praised the gameplay and atmosphere, however noted the short length of the campaign.

In a more critical review, Nova Smith, writing for PC Gamer, stated that the game “is dull, uninspired, and devoid of the series' characteristic wit.”
