= Rahul Kohli =

English actor (born 1985)

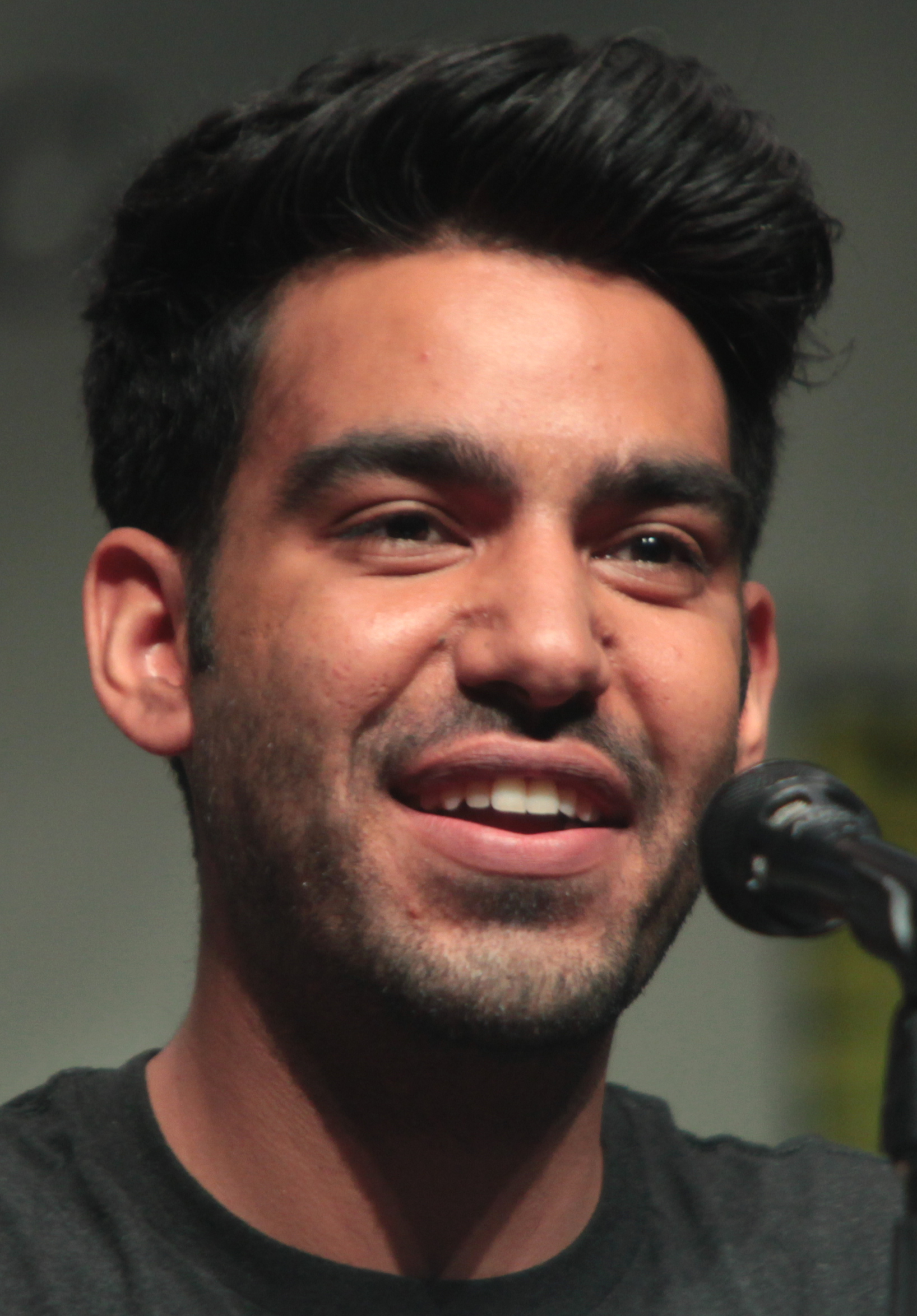
- Kohli in April 2015
- Born: 13 November 1985 (age 40); London, England
- Occupation: Actor
- Years active: 2007–present

Rahul Kohli (born 13 November 1985) is a British actor. On television, he gained prominence through the CW series iZombie (2015–2019), and his collaborations with filmmaker Mike Flanagan in the Netflix series The Haunting of Bly Manor (2020), Midnight Mass (2021), The Fall of the House of Usher (2023), and the Amazon Prime series Carrie (2026). He recently appeared in the Hulu series Death and Other Details (2024) and the Amazon Prime series We Were Liars (2025). His films include Next Exit (2022).

== Early life ==
Rahul Kohli was born in London, the son of Indian immigrants. His mother was raised in Thailand and his father was raised in Kenya. Two of his grandparents were born in areas of British India that are now part of Pakistan. He attended Northolt High School and later enrolled at Uxbridge College to study media. In 2006, he trained with the Questors Theatre company.

== Career ==
Kohli made his acting debut in March 2007 in the short film The Vacancy.

Kohli was cast as the lead role of Dr Ravi Chakrabarti in the CW series iZombie, which he played from 2015 to 2019. He appeared in all 71 episodes of the series. He played Ed in the 2018 Netflix romantic comedy Happy Anniversary. He also appeared in two episodes of the CW series Supergirl in 2017 and 2019. He voiced Jonathan Crane / Scarecrow in the HBO Max animated series Harley Quinn and Aarush Cheena in the Disney Junior series The Rocketeer.

In 2020, Kohli starred as Owen Sharma in The Haunting of Bly Manor, a Netflix horror drama series by Mike Flanagan. He went on to star in Midnight Mass, a supernatural horror miniseries, also created by Flanagan, in the role of Sheriff Hassan Shabazz. The series was released in September 2021.

== Personal life ==
Kohli announced his engagement to Yasmin Molloy in July 2018, though they later split up at an unknown date.. Kohli is an avid gamer and supporter of Liverpool FC. In late 2019, he started dating Australian video game writer and content creator Alanah Pearce. Some time after that, they moved in together.

== Filmography ==
=== Film ===
Year	Title	Role	Notes	Ref.
2007	Vacancy	Tom	Short film	
2018	Happy Anniversary	Ed		
2022	Next Exit	Teddy		
2024	The Life of Chuck	Bri		
2025	The Electric State	Miles Watlow		
2026	Iron Lung	—N/a	Additional voices	
2027	The Exorcist: Martyrs	TBA	Post-production	

=== Television ===
Year	Title	Role	Notes	Ref.
2008	My Holiday Hostage Hell	Navi	Episode: "West Papau"	
2012	Holby City	Cal Nelson	Episode: "Blood Money"	
2013	EastEnders	Manager	Episode aired 16 April 2013	
2015–2019	iZombie	Ravi Chakrabarti	Main role; 71 episodes	
2016	Red vs. Blue	Male Tex	Voice role; Episode: "Get Bent"	
2017, 2019	Supergirl	Jack Spheer	Episodes: "Ace Reporter" and "Confidence Women"	
2019–2020	Harley Quinn	Jonathan Crane / Scarecrow	Voice role; 5 episodes	
2020	The Rocketeer	Aarush Cheena	Voice role; 5 episodes	
2020	The Haunting of Bly Manor	Owen Sharma	Miniseries; 9 episodes	
2021	Midnight Mass	Sheriff Hassan	Miniseries; 7 episodes	
2022	The Midnight Club	Vincent Beggs	Episode: "See You Later"	
2023	The Fall of the House of Usher	Napoleon "Leo" Usher	Miniseries; 7 episodes	
2024	Death and Other Details	Sunil Bhandari	Main role; 9 episodes	
2024	Twilight of the Gods	Egill	Voice role; 8 episodes	
2025	Love, Death & Robots	Vave O'Claw	Voice role; Episode: "400 Boys"	
2025–present	We Were Liars	Ed Patil	Main role; 8 episodes	
2025	The Mighty Nein	Verrat	Voice role; 4 episodes	
2026	Citadel	Charles Bantam	Episodes: "Chinos" and "Unreasonable"	
2026	Carrie	Seth Peist	Recurring role; 5 episodes (season 1)	

=== Video games ===
Year	Title	Role	Notes	Ref.
2019	Rage 2	Garcia the Gregarious		
2019	Gears 5	Fahz Chutani		
2022	Fortnite	The Origin	Chapter 3	
2022	Ghostbusters: Spirits Unleashed	Tobin		
2023	Warhammer 40,000: Boltgun	Malum Caedo		
2023	Stray Gods: The Roleplaying Musical	Minotaur		
2023	Call of Duty: Modern Warfare III	Rupinder "Roops" Kapoor		
2026	Diablo II: Resurrected - Reign of the Warlock	Warlock		
2026	Saros	Arjun Devraj		
2026	Warhammer 40,000: Boltgun 2	Malum Caedo		
