= Bolt gun =

Bolt gun or boltgun may refer to:

- Captive bolt pistol, a device used for stunning animals before slaughter
- Crossbow, a ranged weapon that shoots projectiles called bolts
- A firearm with a bolt action
- A fictional heavy caliber firearm used by Space Marines in the Warhammer 40,000 universe
- Warhammer 40,000: Boltgun, a 2023 video game set in the Warhammer 40,000 universe
