= Next Exit (film) =

2022 American film by Mali Elfman

- Poster
- Directed by: Mali Elfman
- Written by: Mali Elfman
- Produced by: Mali Elfman; Derek Bishé; Narineh Hacopian
- Starring: Katie Parker; Rahul Kohli; Rose McIver; Karen Gillan; Tongayi Chirisa; Diva Zappa
- Cinematography: Azuli Anderson
- Edited by: Brett W. Bachman
- Music by: Ariel Marx
- Production companies: Helmstreet Productions; No Traffic For Ghosts
- Distributed by: Magnet Releasing
- Release dates: June 10, 2022 (Tribeca); November 4, 2022 (United States)
- Running time: 103 minutes
- Country: United States
- Language: English
- Box office: $4,742

Next Exit is a 2022 American science fiction comedy-drama film written and directed by Mali Elfman in her directorial debut. It stars Katie Parker, Rahul Kohli, Rose McIver, Karen Gillan, Tongayi Chirisa, and Diva Zappa. It premiered at the Tribeca Festival on June 10, 2022, and was released in the United States by Magnet Releasing on November 4, 2022.

== Premise ==
A scientific study known as Life Beyond, launched by Dr. Stevenson in San Francisco, allows people to commit painless suicide with the knowledge that an afterlife does exist. In New York City, two ready-to-die strangers, Rose and Teddy, randomly end up sharing a rental car for a cross-country trip to their respective Life Beyond appointments.

== Cast ==
- Katie Parker as Rose
- Rahul Kohli as Teddy
- Rose McIver as Heather
- Tongayi Chirisa as Father Jack
- Tim Griffin as John
- Diva Zappa as Karma
- Nico Evers-Swindell as Nick
- Karen Gillan as Dr. Stevenson

== Production ==
Next Exit is the directorial debut of Mali Elfman, who wrote it more than ten years before its premiere. She would revisit and add on to the script every time she was in a "difficult place" or facing a struggle in her life. She wrote the lead role with her friend Katie Parker in mind, and cast Rahul Kohli as the second lead because she liked his performances in the television series iZombie (2015–2019) and the Netflix series The Haunting of Bly Manor (2020). Elfman's friends Rose McIver and Tongayi Chirisa, both of whom also star in iZombie, as well as Karen Gillan and Diva Zappa star as well.

Next Exit was in development for over eight years when Helmstreet Productions came on board to help finalize the script, finance it, and help film it. It was shot during the COVID-19 pandemic in the states of Missouri, Oklahoma, Texas, New Mexico, and Arizona from January to February 2021.

== Release ==
The film premiered at the Tribeca Festival on June 10, 2022. In July 2022, Magnolia Pictures bought the distribution rights to the film, and scheduled it for release in November 4, 2022 under its genre arm, Magnet Releasing. In August 2022, Blue Finch Films acquired the film's international rights.

=== Critical reception ===
On the review aggregator website Rotten Tomatoes, 80% of 56 critics' reviews are positive, with an average rating of 6.9/10. Metacritic, which uses a weighted average, assigned the film a score of 59 out of 100, based on 12 critics, indicating "mixed or average" reviews.

=== Accolades ===
The film received the award for Best Cinematography at the Tribeca Film Festival.
