= Happy Anniversary (2018 film) =

- Official release poster
- Directed by: Jared Stern
- Written by: Jared Stern
- Produced by: Helena Hyman; M. Elizabeth Hughes; Marc Provissiero; Bryan DeGuire; Scott Fort
- Starring: Noël Wells; Ben Schwartz; Rahul Kohli; Kristin Bauer van Straten; Kate Berlant; Leonardo Nam; David Walton; Isidora Goreshter; Annie Potts; Joe Pantoliano; Jeff Grace
- Cinematography: Nicholas Wiesnet
- Edited by: David Egan
- Music by: Joshua Moshier
- Production companies: Industry Entertainment; Odenkirk Provissiero Entertainment; A Stern Talking To
- Distributed by: Netflix
- Release date: March 30, 2018
- Running time: 78 minutes
- Country: United States
- Language: English

Happy Anniversary is a 2018 American romance comedy film, written and directed by Jared Stern in his directorial debut. It stars Noël Wells, Ben Schwartz, Jeff Grace, Rahul Kohli, Kristin Bauer van Straten, Kate Berlant, Leonardo Nam, David Walton, Isidora Goreshter, Annie Potts and Joe Pantoliano. The plot follows a couple's mini-crisis on their third anniversary.

The film was released on March 30, 2018, by Netflix.

== Cast ==
- Noël Wells as Mollie
- Ben Schwartz as Sam
- Rahul Kohli as Ed
- Kristin Bauer van Straten as Willa
- Kate Berlant as Lindsay
- Leonardo Nam as Hao
- David Walton as Arik
- Isidora Goreshter as Georgia
- Annie Potts as Diane
- Joe Pantoliano as Aldo
- Jeff Grace as Jean Louise (Uncredited)
- Sanchita Malik as Priya
- Molly Schreiber as Sheera Weinberg

== Production ==
In January 2017, it was announced Noël Wells, Ben Schwartz, Annie Potts, and Joe Pantoliano had joined the cast, with Jared Stern directing from a screenplay he wrote. Marc Provissiero, Helena Heyman, M. Elizabeth Hughes were to produce the film under their Odenkirk Provissiero Entertainment and Industry Entertainment banners, respectively. In February 2017, Rahul Kohli joined the cast of the film. Joshua Moshier composed the film's score.

Production began on January 31, 2017, in Los Angeles, California.

== Release ==
The film was released on March 30, 2018.

== Reception ==
On review aggregator website Rotten Tomatoes, the film holds an approval rating of 83%, based on six reviews, and an average rating of 6.4/10.
