= Green Eggs and Ham (TV series) =

American animated television series based on the Dr. Seuss book of the same name

- Promotional poster
- Also known as: Green Eggs and Ham: The Second Serving (season 2)
- Genre: Comedy; Adventure
- Based on: Green Eggs and Ham and The Butter Battle Book by Dr. Seuss
- Developed by: Jared Stern
- Showrunner: Jared Stern
- Voices of: Michael Douglas; Adam DeVine; Ilana Glazer; Diane Keaton
- Narrated by: Keegan-Michael Key
- Theme music composer: Rivers Cuomo (season 1); Daniel Pemberton (season 2); Gary Go (season 2)
- Opening theme: "Backflip" performed by Rivers Cuomo (season 1); "Come With Me" performed by Yola (season 2)
- Ending theme: "Backflip" (season 1); "Come With Me" (cont.) (season 2)
- Composer: David Newman
- Country of origin: United States
- Original language: English
- No. of seasons: 2
- No. of episodes: 23

Production
- Executive producers: Jared Stern; Ellen DeGeneres; Jeff Kleeman; Mike Karz; David Dobkin; Helen Kalafatic (season 2); Sam Register
- Producer: Helen Kalafatic (season 1)
- Editors: Mark Rosenbaum; Margaret Hou; Paul Carrera
- Running time: 27–28 minutes
- Production companies: Dr. Seuss Enterprises; Gulfstream Pictures; A Stern Talking To; A Very Good Production; Warner Bros. Animation

Original release
- Network: Netflix
- Release: November 8, 2019 – April 8, 2022

Green Eggs and Ham, also known as Green Eggs and Ham: The Second Serving for its second season, is an American animated comedy adventure television miniseries developed by Jared Stern for Netflix. It is based on the 1960 children's book by Dr. Seuss.

The first season premiered on November 8, 2019 on Netflix. In March 2022, Netflix announced a second season, entitled Green Eggs and Ham: The Second Serving, which was released on April 8, 2022, and is a loose adaptation of the 1984 children's book The Butter Battle Book by Dr. Seuss.

== Premise ==
=== Season 1 ===
Sam-I-Am rescues a rare Chickeraffe from a zoo, saying that he intends to return it to its natural habitat. After he accidentally swaps his briefcase, containing the Chickeraffe, for that of failed inventor Guy-Am-I, Sam and Guy end up on a road trip adventure with E.B., a girl who wants to adopt the Chickeraffe as a pet, and E.B.'s overprotective mother Michellee, who is also a romantic interest for Guy. The four are pursued by Mr. Hervnick Z. Snerz, a tiny evil poacher and collector, who wants to claim the Chickeraffe (named Mr. Jenkins by E.B.) as a trophy, two mysterious agents called the "BAD GUYS", named McWinkle and Gluntz, and Mr. Snerz's bounty hunter, the Goat (as in the goat that rhymes with "boat" in the book).

=== Season 2 ===
Titled The Second Serving, which picks up right after season one, taking place a week after Mr. Snerz and the Goat's defeat and Mr. Jenkins' departure in Season 1. Sam, Guy, and E.B. set off on another adventure to East Flubria to find Sam's biological mother Pam-I-Am, who reveals that she is stopping the feud between the nations of Yookia and Zookia, which are at war with one another as a precious orb-like object (the Moo-Lacka-Moo) is stolen by her. So it is up to Sam, Guy, Pam, E.B., and her new friend Looka to return the Moo-Lacka-Moo and stop the war.

== Voice Cast ==
=== Main ===
- Adam DeVine as Sam-I-Am, a hyperactive, playful, and happy-go-lucky enthusiast of green eggs and ham. He is Guy's best friend and Pam's son.
- Michael Douglas as Guy-Am-I, a cantankerous, sardonic, and frustrated failed inventor who is revolted by green eggs and ham, despite never having eaten them. He is Sam's best friend, Michellee's husband and E.B.'s half-father, and Guy Jr.'s father. He is the unnamed character in the original book.
- Ilana Glazer as E.B. (Elanabeth) Weebie-Am-I, Michellee's 10-year-old daughter and Guy's stepdaughter, also Sam's best friend and Guy Jr.'s older maternal half-sister who's plucky, good-hearted, and adventurous with a kind heart.
- Diane Keaton as Michellee Weebie-Am-I, E.B.'s and Guy Jr.'s overprotective mother and Guy's wife. This was Keaton's final voice role before her death in October 2025.
- Keegan-Michael Key as the Narrator, the voice who tells the stories of the show.

=== Season 1 ===
- Eddie Izzard as Mr. Snerz, an arrogant businessman who wants to capture Mr. Jenkins. Snerz can be seen as a caricature of Donald Trump.
  - Rob Paulsen voices Little Snerz.
- Jeffrey Wright as McWinkle, a serious member of the BAD GUYS (Bureau of Animal Defense Glurfsburg Upper Yipville Section) who is on his way to retirement and assigned to a rookie member to be a mentor. Every time something goes wrong, his blue fur turns gray, resulting in him becoming fully gray by Episode 13 due to Gluntz’s antics and Guy and Sam getting away. Despite his gruff persona, he is shown to deeply care for the animals he is assigned to protect.
- Jillian Bell as Gluntz, McWinkle's optimistic and easily excited rookie partner. She returns in season 2 as a fully realized B.A.D.G.U.Y.S. agent.
  - In Season 2, Bell also voices Hayzel, a perky (but also tough-as-nails) Zookian guard, who captures Guy and E.B. and interrogates the two in Season 2, Episode 3.
- John Turturro as The Goat, a brutal bounty hunter goat sent by Mr. Snerz. He speaks with a tough Spanish accent. A running gag in the show is that whenever a character is surprised and alerted to his sudden appearance, they yell for example: The Goat is In The... and the scene cuts away to The Goat who proceeds to say I Am In The... .
- Dee Bradley Baker as the vocal effects of Mr. Jenkins (credited as "Chickeraffe"), an energetic chickeraffe (big bird with Ossicones) who Guy and Sam protect.
  - Baker also does the vocal effects of the Giroosters, Squails, Camelopes, Dolphocudas, and all the animal hybrids within the show.
- Fred Tatasciore as Yes-Man, Mr. Snerz's sniveling assistant.
  - Tatasciore also voices Jeremy, Hayzel's "Lie Detector" who helps interrogate Guy and E.B. in Season 2, Episode 3.
- Tracy Morgan as Michael (credited as "Fox"), an eccentric yet ravenous fox who is obsessed with green eggs and has a crush on a green chicken named Sandra. Michael is implied and shown to do through self-rehab, creating mindfulness recordings for himself so he doesn’t destroy the chicken coops and to push back his obsession with eggs so he can win Sandra over. Sam however provokes Michael multiple times resulting in Michael relapsing for quick moments at a time only by saying Sandra’s name.
- Daveed Diggs as Squeaky (credited as "Mouse"), an imprisoned mouse who wants to feed his wife and daughter. He himself is a cross parody of the character "Jean Valjean" from Les Misérables and Diggs' own characterization of Marquis de Lafayette from Hamilton. He speaks with a French accent, though most are unable to understand his language due to being a mouse as the only intelligible vocalization the characters can understand is a simple “squeak”.
- Billy Eichner as Captain Bigman, McWinkle and Gluntz's boss who despite his name is pretty tiny.
- David Kaye, Nika Futterman, Keith Ferguson as the Cronies (Crony 3 is credited as "Big Green Crony").
- Rob Paulsen as Pool Shark
- David Kaye as Joaquin Furmano, a news reporter.(Furmano later appears in Season 2)
- Grey Griffin as Ty, Guy-Am-I's niece, a member of Am-I family.
- Chris Diamantopoulos as Bean Counter, who works for SnerzCo.

=== Season 2 ===
- Patricia Clarkson as Pam-I-Am, Sam's long-lost biological mother and an international super spy working for Yookia to retrieve a dangerous substance known as the Moo-Lacka-Moo.
- Jose Andres as Sylvester, a super spy who works alongside Pam and Yookia. He lives with his wife Hester, five children named Lester, and their gerbil Allan.
- Rob Brydon as Philip Trousers, a vain but unintelligent super spy and Pam's arch-rival who is working for Zookia to retrieve the Moo-Lacka-Moo.
  - Brydon also voices Snalfred, Pam's elderly and stiff butler.
- Gwendoline Christie as Marilyn Blouse, a beautiful and intelligent super spy who works with Trousers and Zookia.
- Rita Moreno as the Dookess of Zookia, the ruler of Zookia.
- Hector Elizondo as the Dooka of Yookia, the ruler of Yookia and Looka's father.
- Darren Criss as Looka Ba-Dooka, the "Crown Dooka of Yookia, Chief Yookeroo, Order of the Unburnt Toast, Seventeenth of His Name", the Dooka of Yookia's son, and E.B.'s crush.
- Kevin M. Richardson as Gobo, Chief of the Robababobrians.
- James Marsden as Bo, a maroonee trapped within the Keela-Kee Trapezoid, where he stays in one place to stay at his perfect age.
- Marques Ray as Guy Watcher, a Zookian hired by the Dookess to watch over Guy and his inventing.

== Episodes ==
=== Series overview ===
| Season | Episodes | Originally released |
|---|---|---|
| 1 | 13 | November 8, 2019 |
| 2 | 10 | April 8, 2022 |

=== Season 1 (2019) ===
| No. overall | No. in season | Title | Directed by | Written by | Original release date |
|---|---|---|---|---|---|
| 1 | 1 | "Here" | Lawrence Gong | Jared Stern | November 8, 2019 |
In the town of Glurfsburg, a spy breaks into a zoo and liberates a Chickeraffe (chicken-giraffe hybrid), a rare and endangered animal. Meanwhile, Guy-Am-I, an inventor, heads to Snerz Co. as Sam-I-Am, a cheerful person, walks down the same street. Guy presents his invention, a self-flyer, so he can win a ticket to Meepville. His invention explodes while his fellow inventors all get to go. Michellee, a literal bean counter for Snerz Co., worries over her daughter E.B. (Elanabeth), who wants a pet. She learns of the Chickeraffe's escape and plans to catch it. McWinkle and Gluntz, two mysterious "B.A.D.G.U.Y.S," interrogate the zoo guard, who claims that he saw a kite, a snorkel, and a pole vault. At the same time, Hervnick Z. Snerz, the head businessman in Meepville, along with his sniveling assistant Yes-Man, wants the Chickeraffe for his rare animal collection. Guy, who gives up inventing and decides to be a paint watcher, stops by a diner and encounters Sam, who orders his favorite dish: green eggs and ham. Despite voicing his distaste for the dish, Sam orders them for everyone in the diner. Guy ends up leaving but accidentally takes Sam's identical briefcase. After Michellee sees the news of the Chickeraffe's escape, she prevents E.B. as they are headed to Meepville as well. Guy heads to the motel for the night. As Sam leaves the diner, he sees two police officers trying to locate the Chickeraffe, causing him to reveal himself as the mastermind of the theft. Guy attempts to burn Sam's briefcase in a severe state of depression, but he takes it out due to faint noises from the briefcase. He opens it, and the Chickeraffe comes out.
| 2 | 2 | "Car" | Piero Piluso | John Whittington | November 8, 2019 |
The playful Chickeraffe proceeds to destroy the motel room, and Guy tries to sequester the creature. Sam returns to his home, a run-down isolated RV, and discovers that he has the wrong suitcase. After getting a supposed earful from Snerz, Gluntz learns that McWinkle plans to retire from the business, so they manage to trace it to Sam's home just as Guy figures out where he lives. Guy is confronted by the two, but is rescued by Sam, who steals their car and flees, causing McWinkle to turn his fur grey. Sam reveals that he is an animal liberator and that, just like Guy, he is headed to Meepville. Not wanting to put up with him, Guy gets out in the middle of the desert. Meanwhile, Michellee tells E.B. that Meepville will be fun. Guy flags down Michellee's car, but she turns down picking him up, despite E.B.'s protests, and Guy ends up hallucinating from the heat. He can even hear the narrator's voice and go insane from green eggs and ham. He is rescued by Sam, who once again offers him green eggs and ham, but Guy tells him that he will not have them in the car. Guy sleeps but awakens to see Sam and the Chickeraffe running beside the car heading towards a cliff.
| 3 | 3 | "Train" | Lawrence Gong | Mark Rizzo | November 8, 2019 |
Sam rescues Guy from the car as it lands in a lake and flattens the house of One Fish, Two Fish, Red Fish, Blue Fish. He reveals that he had to get rid of it so it could not be traced. They buy a couple of tickets for a train, forcing Guy to stay with Sam for a while longer. Michellee and E.B. also take the train as they head to Meepville. As the car is fished out of the water, McWinkle and Gluntz find evidence of the Chickeraffe being there and deduce that it is on a train. Sam and Guy run into Michellee and E.B., where Sam orders them green eggs and ham. Snerz reveals that he wants the Chickeraffe to impress his cronies. Later at night, Sam sneaks out with the Chickeraffe and runs into E.B. They sit on top of the train while the Chickeraffe stays inside. Meanwhile, Guy heads to the Quiet Car and runs into Michellee. The train is heading towards a loop with E.B.'s friendship bracelet sticking on top of it until there is another loop in the way, causing her and Sam to fall off, but they are rescued by the Chickeraffe, which E.B. learns of the creature's existence. Guy and Michellee keep being quiet in the Quiet Car. E.B. decides to name the Chickeraffe, Mr. Jenkins, until she and Sam see Guy and Michellee returning to their rooms. In the morning, Guy gets mad at Sam and angrily tells him that he wants nothing to do with him anymore after E.B. finds out about the Chickeraffe. As he gets off the train, he is confronted by McWinkle and Gluntz.
| 4 | 4 | "Fox" | Piero Piluso | Vanessa McGee | November 8, 2019 |
Guy returns on the train with McWinkle and Gluntz in hot pursuit, where E.B. inadvertently reveals its existence to Michellee, who gets upset at Guy for being lied to. Before Guy tries to get Michellee to talk to her, McWinkle and Gluntz show up. Sam, Guy, and Mr. Jenkins are forced to jump off the train to escape them and end up in a quarry. E.B. runs off to see if Mr. Jenkins managed to escape McWinkle and Gluntz, causing Michellee to take her to a private Car. McWinkle and Gluntz try to have the train turned around, but they get kicked off for not having tickets. Snerz invites his cronies to a met gala for the eventual Chickeraffe. Sam and Guy learn that Mr. Jenkins likes to eat ties and spot a farmhouse in the distance. The house has no ties, but a fox named Michael, who guards the green eggs, wears a tie. Back on the train, Michellee is shocked to learn that E.B. is riding on top of the train. Michael is trying to impress Sandra, one of the green hens, and vent his love for eggs and as he meditates, Sam and Guy break into his foxhole to steal his tie. They are successful but open a closet full of green eggs. Michael spots them and furiously lunges at them.
| 5 | 5 | "Dark" | Lawrence Gong | Jared Stern | November 8, 2019 |
Michael breaks down and reveals his hopeless love of green eggs and his contradictory love for Sandra, and Sam and Guy leave with the ties, promising not to say anything, though Michael mishears and tries to attack them. As the sun sets, Sam, Guy, and Mr. Jenkins spot a motel sign but learn that it is actually in the middle of a junk pit, and they get stuck. Meanwhile, Michellee and E.B. leave the train and drive to a B&B. E.B. becomes bored, especially when Michellee fails to grasp E.B.'s creative side. Guy makes a fire, but Sam's soft drink causes it to disappear. Sam and Guy then find an exit, but it turns out to be a large tube of toxic sludge, and they get trapped in a pile of trash. While E.B. goes to watch the grass grow, Michellee draws a picture of the Chickeraffe to make her feel better. Guy reveals that each of his previous inventions has exploded, and he has lost hope. The narrator reveals that Mr. Jenkins lived with his mother at Chickeraffe Island when he was a little Chickeraffe, but then he was captured. With Sam's encouragement, Guy manages to build a contraption. E.B. discovers that Michellee drew a perfect picture of the Chickeraffe as a way to make up for losing it. After building a contraption, Sam, Guy, and Mr. Jenkins escape. They arrive at a diner in Prinz Pazookle, but a woman's pet flea scares Mr. Jenkins, and he breaks free from the suitcase and begins running amok in the diner.
| 6 | 6 | "Box" | Piero Piluso | Mark Rizzo | November 8, 2019 |
Sam and Guy flee with Mr. Jenkins and switch hats to disguise themselves. McWinkle and Gluntz, who had faked their drowning and escaped from the swamp, learn that Sam and Guy are in Prinz Pazookle. Snerz gets upset that the Chickeraffe is in Prinz Pazookle. Meanwhile, Michellee takes E.B. to see the world's smallest thermometer. When E.B. yells her displeasure about how boring and selfish she can be, Michellee is convinced to take her to the carnival to prove her wrong. With no money, Sam and Guy resort to working as Dave and Randy at the carnival. As McWinkle and Gluntz interrogate the waiter of the diner, Michellee and E.B. look around in the carnival. While Mr. Jenkins hides as a prize, Sam works at the Wheel of Insanity ride, and Guy works at the Relaxation Station dunk tank. McWinkle and Gluntz head to the carnival to find Mr. Jenkins. Michellee and E.B. get on the Wheel of Insanity just as Guy switches jobs with Sam and finds himself sending the two on a wild ride. McWinkle and Gluntz steal Mr. Jenkins. Guy speaks with Michellee, who again gets upset at him for supposedly lying to her. McWinkle and Gluntz try to make off with Mr. Jenkins, but Sam and Guy rescue him. E.B. gives the two a bruckle, and they ship themselves to Shvizelton with McWinkle and Gluntz in hot pursuit. As Sam and Guy switch hats back, Sam suddenly gets arrested by the police officer, with Guy wondering what he will do.
| 7 | 7 | "Mouse" | Lawrence Gong | Mark Rizzo | November 8, 2019 |
Sam manages to escape his cuffs but sees Guy and Mr. Jenkins leaving by taxi, and he solemnly allows himself to be arrested. McWinkle and Gluntz arrive in Shvizelton. Guy is guilty of leaving Sam and decides to rescue him from jail. After interrogating, McWinkle and Gluntz learn that Sam was incarcerated while Snerz thinks the Chickeraffe is being delivered. Sam meets his cellmate, a mouse that he names Squeaky, who, to Sam, speaks with a proper French accent but communicates in unintelligible squeaking to others. He was arrested for stealing a small piece of cheese for himself and his family. Guy arrives and allows himself to be arrested. As McWinkle and Gluntz arrive just in time, Squeaky reveals that he has dug a tunnel to escape. He, Sam, and Guy grab their things and flee through the sewer systems. The group manages to come out far from the prison. As it begins to rain, Squeaky leaves to reunite with his family. McWinkle gets upset after Sam and Guy escape. Sam, Guy, and Mr. Jenkins trek before encountering a cabin. However, Michellee is inside and will not let them in because she still thinks they are fugitives.
| 8 | 8 | "Rain" | Piero Piluso | Vanessa McGee | November 8, 2019 |
Sam, Guy, and Mr. Jenkins are forced to sit out in the rain, where Sam realizes that Guy has a crush on Michellee. After McWinkle and Gluntz interrogate the police officers, Snerz sees the news of Sam and Guy taking the Chickeraffe and orders Yes-Man to look for the Goat. E.B. begs Michellee to let Sam, Guy, and Mr. Jenkins stay inside for the night, and she finally caves. Sam has Guy hang out with E.B. to dry up Mr. Jenkins while he stays with Michellee to cook a vegan tofu version of green eggs and ham. Guy and E.B. have trouble using a giant bellows to dry Mr. Jenkins, so E.B. uses Michellee's jar of beans and accidentally launches it out of the roof and into the woods. They jump after it while Sam distracts Michellee. Meanwhile, Yes-Man heads to the bar, where the Goat attacks the people for calling him a sheep. E.B. learns that Guy likes her mom, and they find Michellee's bean jar with the Giroosters (giraffe rooster hybrids), the deadliest judgivores, and get chased by them. Michellee panics when Sam accidentally reveals that he and Guy were in jail. Guy orders the Giroosters to give him the jar back. He and E.B. return in time to divert suspicion. Meanwhile, Yes-Man calls Snerz and tells him that the Goat is taking the job of hunting the Chickeraffe.
| 9 | 9 | "Goat" | Piero Piluso | John Whittington | November 8, 2019 |
The Goat spots the Chickeraffe's feather. Meanwhile, Sam, Guy, Michellee, E.B., and Mr. Jenkins get ready to leave for Meepville together. Snerz gets interviewed for a magazine, and the interviewer tells him to talk about his love of animals. When Guy spots the Goat out in the front, Sam explains that he is dangerous and convinces him to let Michellee and E.B. leave ahead without them to protect them. The Goat proceeds to attack the cabin as Guy and Sam distract him and escape with Mr. Jenkins with the Goat in hot pursuit. Snerz reveals that when he was little, he had a pet Flemur (flamingo-lemur hybrid), but when he saw that it was gone and the door was left open, he blamed his mother for losing it. McWinkle and Gluntz are saddened over not finding any leads. Sam, Guy, and Mr. Jenkins end up climbing a snowy mountain, where the Goat kidnaps Mr. Jenkins. The interviewer learns that Snerz had not spoken to his mother since he was six years old. Meanwhile, Michellee tells E.B. they will never see Sam and Guy again. Seeing Sam and Guy in danger gives Mr. Jenkins the courage to fight back and toss the Goat away up the mountain, allowing them to escape. The suspicious interviewer meets with Snerz's mother and learns that Snerz loved his Flemur (flamingo-lemur hybrid) too much and it wanted to leave, to which the mother complied. Snerz asks Yes-Man if the cuffs are ready for the Chickeraffe. Sam and Guy use the Goat's credit card to buy bus tickets to Stovepipe Junction, which concerns Guy. McWinkle suddenly realizes Sam's love for green eggs and ham.
| 10 | 10 | "House" | Lawrence Gong | Jared Stern | November 8, 2019 |
After realizing Sam's love for green eggs and ham, McWinkle and Gluntz manage to continue the search. Sam, Guy, and Mr. Jenkins arrive at Stovepipe Junction. McWinkle tells Gluntz that they will zero in on Sam. Sam and Guy try to book a motel room, where everyone seems to recognize Guy as the Goat survived the avalanche and continues to hunt for the Chickeraffe. It is revealed that Stovepipe Junction is Guy's birthplace, and he is considered most likely to succeed in high school. As McWinkle and Gluntz interrogate every waitstaff of every restaurant, Guy wants to avoid seeing his family as they consider him a failure, and he and Sam try to enter his childhood treehouse. They get caught, but contrary to Guy's claim, his family fully supports his creative endeavors. He announces to them that he is no longer inventing and that he will become a paint watcher and leaves for his treehouse angrily. Sam talks to Guy, who admits he feels insecure around his family due to their successful achievements. Sam then reveals that he never had a family and lived most of his life in an orphanage (throughout the show, he mentions his mysterious past with his mother, but that was all lies). He loves green eggs and ham because he still remembers how his mother cooks them, and he hoped that once he found the right flavor from various diners he visited, he would find her as well. Guy feels better and apologizes. When Sam enters the house, he calls Snerz, revealing that he is actually the one employed by Snerz to take the Chickeraffe to him from the very start.
| 11 | 11 | "Boat" | Lawrence Gong | Vanessa McGee | November 8, 2019 |
A guilt-ridden Sam tries to stall Guy, who has bought tickets for the ferry to Meepville. Just as Guy is about to try green eggs and ham, McWinkle and Gluntz arrive at the Am-I household, but Sam and Guy manage to escape on a small boat. At this point, McWinkle and Gluntz reveal that B.A.D.G.U.Y.S. is actually an acronym for Bureau of Animal Defense Glurfsburg Upper Yipville Section, that they had been trying to put the Chickeraffe in a zoo and that they are enemies with the Goat. Sam, Guy, and Mr. Jenkins get on the ferry and run into Michellee and E.B. again. While E.B. is happy to see them, Michellee still is upset with Guy, even though he apologizes for splitting from them. After McWinkle and Gluntz get an earful from their boss, Captain Walter Bigman, the Am-I's comply with them. As the ferry transforms itself into a submarine and dives, Guy and Michellee finally grow closer. After speaking with E.B., Sam gets over his guilt and decides to save Mr. Jenkins for real. They arrive in Meepville, and Michellee gives Guy her phone number. The Goat appears and scares Sam and Guy back onto the boat. He causes it to capsize, grabs the briefcase, and makes off with Mr. Jenkins.
| 12 | 12 | "There" | Piero Piluso | Mark Rizzo | November 8, 2019 |
Sam and Guy escape from the drowning boat. McWinkle and Gluntz catch up with the Goat and manage to capture him. Sam and Guy arrive to get Mr. Jenkins back, but Guy gets caught. He learns about McWinkle and Gluntz's true purpose and is taken in to be questioned. E.B. wants to go to a toy store with a roller coaster inside, but Michellee tells her they are going somewhere better. McWinkle tells Guy about Sam, his many aliases, and his intent to sell Mr. Jenkins. Michellee takes E.B. to the Hall of Walls, an art gallery, and E.B. learns that Michellee used to paint for a living but gave it up once her husband died so that she could take care of her. Meanwhile, Sam tries to break Guy out of holding, but he is still angry at him for lying and is further angered at being offered green eggs and ham again. Guy yells and lashes out loudly at Sam, viciously declaring that he does not fit in with anybody or even his mother, but he quickly regrets it. Sam sadly leaves with Mr. Jenkins. A guilt-ridden and saddened Guy tells McWinkle and Gluntz that Snerz is buying the Chickeraffe, letting him go. Snerz puts on his met gala as Michellee and E.B. attend. Guy stops by a diner before he goes to his paint-watching job. E.B. spots Sam at the gala and wanders backstage to discover, to her horror, that Sam is selling Mr. Jenkins to Snerz.
| 13 | 13 | "Anywhere" | Lawrence Gong | Jared Stern | November 8, 2019 |
E.B. is heartbroken upon seeing Sam sell Mr. Jenkins to Snerz. Meanwhile, Guy is watching paint dry on the wall. E.B. tries to break Mr. Jenkins out and gets the attention of both Michellee and Guy, who go to investigate the noises coming from behind a wall he was watching paint dry from. Michellee sees Snerz's pet collection, and when Guy walks into the same room, she immediately accuses him of animal abuse, causing them to argue. Snerz tells his cronies to come with him and see the Chickeraffe. E.B. realizes that Mr. Jenkins, the Chickeraffe is a painted Girooster, relieving Guy and Michellee. As McWinkle and Gluntz show up, E.B. tells Michellee to spill the beans. They all escape just as Snerz realizes he has been "bamboozled" and expose him as a fraud. They find Sam at a cold air balloon port with plans to send Mr. Jenkins home to Chickeraffe Island. Sam is still upset at Guy for what he said earlier, and Guy makes it up to him by finally eating green eggs and ham, much to his surprised enjoyment. McWinkle, Gluntz and Snerz arrive and chase the group up the port tower. Guy, Sam, Michellee, E.B., and Mr. Jenkins make it to Platform 71, and Snerz gets entrapped. McWinkle lets them go upon learning of Sam's mission, finally retires from B.A.D.G.U.Y.S., and gives Gluntz his hat, making her an official B.A.D.G.U.Y. agent. The balloon gets hijacked by the Goat, and Guy uses his failed invention to save Mr. Jenkins and finally defeat the Goat, as well as receiving a kiss from Michellee. After that, Mr. Jenkins returns to Chickeraffe Island. As everyone returns to Glurfsburg, Sam and Guy are having green eggs and ham when Sam recognizes the taste as his mother's. He learns that the eggs come from East Flubria and is about to embark on another adventure.

=== Season 2: The Second Serving (2022) ===
| No. overall | No. in season | Title | Directed by | Written by | Original release date |
|---|---|---|---|---|---|
| 14 | 1 | "The Mom Identity" | Piero Piluso | Jared Stern & John Whittington | April 8, 2022 |
At night, a spy breaks into a secret lab and steals a dangerous substance known as the Moo-Lacka-Moo. Meanwhile, Sam continues to make plans to find his mother in East Flubria. Overseas, it is learned that the nations of Yookia and Zookia are at war with one another. Guy and Michellee are revealed to have been married, with the former having built an Inventionarium shop and Guy cannot find the time to travel with Sam. However, on opening day, the shop explodes with Gluntz convinced that it was sabotage. Michellee tells Guy to go with Sam so that he is not so stressed and E.B. also joins them. On the way, Sam has a dream of trying to find his mother. Upon arrival in East Flubria, Sam, Guy and E.B. arrive at the factory where they produce green eggs. They manage to get an address, though it is written in chicken scratch due to the employees all being chickens, but manage to find the house. The house is occupied by a tiny old lady, but Sam recognizes that it is indeed the childhood home where he once lived. As they are about to leave defeated at a dead end, Sam witnesses a briefcase getting swapped and tries to return it, only to encounter two spies fighting over it. The briefcase contains the Moo-Lacka-Moo and as one of the spies takes off with it refers to the other spy as Pam-I-Am, who is revealed to be Sam's biological mother.
| 15 | 2 | "Tinker Tailor Mother Spy" | Bradley Raymond | Mark Rizzo | April 8, 2022 |
Pam protects Sam, Guy and E.B. from Zookian goons. She then reveals that she works in Zookia as does her partner Sylvester Van Vester, who reveals that the Moo-Lacka-Moo is being taken to Zookia. As the gang manages to hide in baskets, one Zookian goon opens one of them containing a Skunake (skunk-snake hybrid), who attacks him. Despite Sam wanting to bond with her, it is apparent that Pam, while caring, has no time to act motherly. They arrive at a small Robababobrian village in the desert where Pam keeps some of her spy equipment. Sam excitedly tries to have her make green eggs and ham or tell a story to him, but she is not in the mood. E.B. begins to admire her, flummoxing Guy who tries to tell Sam that Pam does not have any interest in being a mother at the moment, but he refuses to listen. In the morning, Pam gets the group to leave via a stampede of Camelopes (camel-antelope hybrids) and they make it to the port of Ta-Gong. Sam comes to finally realize that Pam has no time for him and tells him that she will meet up with him in Glurfsburg someday. As Guy and E.B. get on the boat back home, Sam declares that he is staying to help his mother. Before Guy and E.B. can do anything about it, two Zookian goons bag them.
| 16 | 3 | "Goldenguy" | Piero Piluso | Brian Schacter | April 8, 2022 |
Guy and E.B. find themselves being interrogated by Hayzel and Jeremy of Zookia. Meanwhile, Pam chases after her rival, Philip Trousers, who has the Moo-Lacka-Moo, via boat, only to discover that Sam has stowed away. Once Hayzel realizes that everything Guy and E.B. told her was true, she explains that Yookia is evil and that Zookia is a good nation due to how they butter their toast: butter side down. As Pam and Trousers get close, Sam's ineptitude causes them to lose him. Guy and E.B. are given a tour of Zookia and while E.B. is impressed, Guy just wants to return home. When Hayzel learns that Guy is an inventor, she takes them to Zookia Institute of Technology (Z.I.T.). Pam leaves Sam on a buoy with a flair gun; leaving him to finally realize that she does not want him around. Guy excitedly designs an "anti-weapon"; impressing the Dookess of Zookia who offers to hire Guy, who reluctantly agrees. Pam catches up to Trousers, but her boat is suddenly destroyed and she is about to be eaten by Dolphacudas (dolphin-barracuda hybrids).
| 17 | 4 | "Three Days of the Mom-dor" | Bradley Raymond | Katie Greenway & Kate Thulin | April 8, 2022 |
Sam rescues Pam using the flair gun and she agrees to let him join her on her mission. The two spot Trousers, along with his partner, Miss Marilyn Blouse, and manage to tail them to a party. Meanwhile, E.B. asks Guy if she can go explore Zookia and he agrees and gives her a funpass, an object that directs people to the next best thing. After exploring, E.B. heads to the wall, where a Squail (squirrel-quail hybrids) takes her funpass. Despite Pam's reluctance, Sam uses the disguise of Dr. Linda Schwartz to get them in (the name taker's marriage was saved by her). After Sam accidentally causes a tower of soft drinks to collapse, Trousers and Blouse flee. E.B. chases the Squail up the wall before she gets her funpass back and meets a boy named Looka Ba-Dooka. The two then become friends. As Sam and Pam try to find a secret passageway, Sam presses a button, which turns the floor into stairs. When E.B. discovers that Looka is from Yookia, she quietly leaves. Sam and Pam find Trousers and Blouse in a secret lab under the party and a fight breaks out. While Trousers and Blouse escape, Sam manages to retrieve the Moo-Lacka-Moo, which impresses Pam. After E.B. hears an overjoyed Guy explain how they will be staying longer and badmouthing the Yooks, she becomes curious and decides to go climb the wall at night. Once Sam and Pam leave the lab, it turns out to be a heat-absorbing substance called the Goo-Lacka-Goo and they escape from the party from getting absorbed. As E.B climbs the wall, she gets caught by the guards.
| 18 | 5 | "To Yookia With Love" | Piero Piluso | Jared Stern | April 8, 2022 |
As Sam and Pam use a cloaking device so they cannot be seen and Guy closes the door so he cannot be interrupted, the narrator manages to take a break from them and make the episode focus on E.B., who manages to evade the guards and runs into Looka again. Looka, knowing that E.B. is from Glurfsburg, but thinking that she is visiting Yookia, shows her around the country. To her surprise, Yookia looks just like Zookia in every way, right down to the Aquatic Center waterpark being lavish (she was told that it was a dirty hole filled with water back in Episode 3). The narrator cuts to Michellee, who is at home in Glurfsburg and walking down the street, before the narrator cuts back to E.B. and Looka. After having fun at the waterpark, E.B. is relieved to learn that Looka also does not believe that the other side is so bad and venture into an abandoned part of the museum where they learn that Yookia and Zookia were once one nation called Ookia that was split after the Dooka and Dookess (as children) argued over how to butter their toast. The narrator cuts to Michellee again, who is shopping for food and getting a checkup. Looka takes E.B. to his house where he reveals that he is the son of the Dooka, who is inattentive to him. E.B. solemnly reveals that she came from Zookia; forcing Looka to hurriedly take her back to the wall before they seal it off. They promise to see each other again. Back in Glurfsburg, the narrator is shocked to learn that Michellee is pregnant as she sends a message to Guy, who is preoccupied at the moment.
| 19 | 6 | "You Only Mom Twice" | Bradley Raymond | John Whittington | April 8, 2022 |
E.B. makes it back to the house, but realizes that she left her funpass somewhere over the wall. Elsewhere, Sam and Pam chase Trousers to the Keela-Kee Trapezoid, where ships have mysteriously vanished. Upon landing, Trousers loses the Moo-Lacka-Moo to a Kangarangutan (kangaroo-orangutan hybrid). Meanwhile, Guy gets Michellee's message and asks to work full time, made better when the Dookess learns that Michellee is a painter and hires her too. Sam and Pam encounter an islander named Bo, who reveals that the deeper into the island you go, the younger you become. As the two venture deeper, it becomes evident that Pam neglected her priorities with Sam. As he becomes a baby, Pam protects him from the Kangarangutans, who empathetically relate to her and give her the Moo-Lacka-Moo. Trousers, riding a Crocopotamus (crocodile-hippopotamus hybrid), catches up and as they escape the island, Pam and Sam hastily experience the times they should have had growing up. Trousers is accosted by Crocopotamuses. Believing that Guy and E.B. have been kidnapped, Bo gives Sam and Pam his boat to escape the island. Back at Zookia, Guy calls Michellee and tells her that Zookia is a great place. The Zook guards find E.B.'s funpass for Guy.
| 20 | 7 | "Guyfall" | Piero Piluso | Katie Greenway & Brian Schacter | April 8, 2022 |
Guy returns to the house and confronts E.B. about the funpass and while making her lunch as Guy learns what she has been up to. Despite her attempts to explain the Yooks to Guy, he forbids her from seeing Looka again. In Yookia, Looka attempts to do the same with his father, but he also forbids him from seeing E.B. again. Meanwhile, Sam and Pam sneak into a restricted area by putting the guards into sleep. Guy reveals where Looka was supposed to meet with E.B. and the Zook guards have him captured, much to E.B.'s anger who refuses to speak with him now. A very delighted Sam and Pam "rescue" the two of them and take them to their safehouse for the night. Guy reveals that Michellee is having a baby, but E.B. is still angry with him. Guy becomes suspicious of Pam when she fails to remember how the Yooks and Zooks butter their toast and becomes convinced that her mission to return the Moo-Lacka-Moo to the Yooks is for selfish reasons. Sam tries getting E.B. to make up with him. Guy tells Sam what Pam told him until he realizes that she still has not made green eggs and ham for him. He then tells him that they should take the Moo-Lacka-Moo to Zookia. Later, Guy tries to convince E.B. that they should leave with Sam, but she rebuffs him. Sam takes the Moo-Lacka-Moo and wakes up Pam as they leave to deliver it to the Yooks.
| 21 | 8 | "The Sam Who Came in From the Cold" | Bradley Raymond | Mark Rizzo & Kate Thulin | April 8, 2022 |
The next morning, Guy and E.B. discover that Sam and Pam have fled with the Moo-Lacka-Moo. They are immediately found by Trousers, Blouse, and the Zooks who take them back to the country. As Guy gets back to work, he sadly discovers that the Dookess and the Zooks intentionally want his inventions to explode and urge him to continue working when Michellee arrives. He manages to assure her. Meanwhile, Sam and Pam deliver the Moo-Lacka-Moo to the Dooka and are rewarded. Michellee tries to talk to E.B., but she is upset to talk with her. She manages to go save Looka from jail. Pam takes Sam to her lavish spy apartment and finally makes him green eggs and ham, much to his pleasure. Meanwhile, Guy realizes that the Dookess has hired a watcher to watch over him and his inventing until Michellee talks with him. When Sam tastes green eggs and ham, he likes the way Pam makes it. Guy discovers that E.B. snuck out of the house again to rescue Looka. Guy surprisingly helps her and she frees Looka who is well aware that his imprisonment was not her fault. Sam is shocked to discover that the Yooks plan to use the Moo-Lacka-Moo on the Zooks and demands he and Pam go back. However, Pam, not wanting to give up Sam again because of her spy life, tries to tell him that they are safer together and away from them. Sam disagrees and leaves to rescue his friends.
| 22 | 9 | "On Her Dookess' Secret Service" | Piero Piluso | Mark Rizzo, Brian Schacter & Kate Thulin | April 8, 2022 |
Pam is given her next mission which is to take out Sam. As Sam hurries to Yookia to reclaim the Moo-Lacka-Moo, Guy explains to Michellee what is happening, but they are quickly caught by the Dookess and her guards. He convinces her to let Michellee stay with him because she is his "secret weapon". E.B. and Looka are now slightly identifying as boyfriend and girlfriend. Sam sneaks into the restricted area while Pam follows him. Guy dismantles his invention while Michellee distracts his watcher with a painting. E.B. and Looka go to the Dooka to inform him of what is happening. As Guy's watcher is about to take Michellee away, she decides to do fake labor, which is the perfect distraction. The Dooka sends Looka and E.B. to Looka's room and insists on using the Moo-Lacka-Moo to destroy Zookia. Michellee keeps fake laboring before getting rid of Guy's watcher quickly. Sam goes climbing through the vents and rescues E.B. and Looka before being told where the Moo-Lacka-Moo is being held. E.B. and Looka go to rescue their respective side's people and promise to meet each other later. As Sam finally gets the Moo-Lacka-Moo, he is suddenly confronted by Trousers. Pam is revealed to have headed to Zookia and confronts Guy and Michellee.
| 23 | 10 | "The Mom Who Loved Me" | Bradley Raymond | Katie Greenway, Mark Rizzo, Jared Stern & John Whittington | April 8, 2022 |
Guy and Pam both realize that they are both dismantling the bomb when Michellee suddenly goes into real labor (she faked it in the last episode so Guy could dismantle his weapon). Sam and Trousers fight over the Moo-Lacka-Moo, but they lose it. Guy, Michellee and Pam are confronted by the Dookess and her guards whom Pam and Michellee fight off. Guy tries to take the bomb apart, but the Dookess prepares it to be launched. The Moo-Lacka-Moo ends up in the hands of the Dooka who attaches it to his missile to launch. E.B. and Looka manage to get their respective sides to hide underground. As soon as the Dookess sees the missile, she speeds up the launch. Both bombs fire off with Sam and Pam riding both of them. They meet halfway as the bombs collide and blow up in the sky. Pam uses the Goo-Lacka-Goo to contain the combined explosions with only the wall getting destroyed. Trousers gets caught in the goo and Blouse blows him away. E.B. and Looka meet and create a butter sandwich for everyone to see. The Dooka and Dookess reluctantly share it to the delight of everyone, and they become Ookia again. Gluntz arrives, revealing that the conflict was started by cows in order to raise the profit margins of the butter industry for "the 2%", though no one believes her except the Dooka and Dookess, who take them into "custardy". Michellee gives birth to a baby boy named Guy Jr. (he looks identical to Guy hence the name). Everyone returns to Glurfsburg with E.B. keeping a long-distance relationship with Looka, Guy's inventions finally stop exploding thanks to some Goo-Lacka-Goo Pam gave him, and Sam makes green eggs and ham for Pam at home.

== Production ==
=== Development ===
On April 29, 2015, Netflix announced that it had given the production a series order consisting of thirteen episodes. At the same time, Deadline Hollywood reported that production on the series would take three years and was expected to be the most expensive animated program to make with each episode costing five to six million dollars. Production companies involved in the series include Warner Bros. Animation, A Very Good Production, A Stern Talking To and Gulfstream Pictures. Animation services for Season 1 were provided by Chromosphere Studio, Company 3 Animation (formerly Deluxe Animation Studios), Folimage, Snipple Animation Studios, Tonic DNA, and Yowza! Animation. In Season 2, they were provided by FuseFX, Snipple Animation Studios, Yowza! Animation, Digital eMation, Neon Creation, and Inspidea, with Chromosphere Studio animating the theme song, and Company 3 Animation doing post-production. The series was originally slated to premiere in the autumn of 2018 before receiving its autumn 2019 premiere window. On December 21, 2019, Netflix renewed the series for a second season with 10 episodes loosely based on The Butter Battle Book as revealed from the trailer on March 10, 2022. On October 8, 2022, Jared Stern announced that the series would not be returning for a third season.

=== Casting ===
On February 19, 2019, the cast of the series was announced with Adam DeVine and Michael Douglas voicing the lead roles while Diane Keaton, Ilana Glazer, Eddie Izzard, Tracy Morgan, Daveed Diggs, John Turturro, Jeffrey Wright and Jillian Bell would have supporting roles.

=== Music ===
The music for the series is composed by David Newman, who previously composed the score for The Cat in the Hat (2003). It is Newman's first score for a television series, as well as his first score for an animated project since Ice Age (2002). For the first season, Newman conducted the score, performed by at least a 79-piece ensemble of the Hollywood Studio Symphony and recorded at the Eastwood Scoring Stage at Warner Bros. Studios, while the scoring session for the show's season finale took place in the Newman Scoring Stage at Fox Studios.

== Reception ==
=== Critical response ===
On Rotten Tomatoes, the first season has an approval rating of 100% and an average rating of 8.5/10, based on 8 reviews. The website's critical consensus reads, "Critics love its animation, the way it plays with expectations. With goofy jokes and surprising wham, you may just love Green Eggs and Ham." Metacritic assigned the season a score of 89 out of 100, based on 4 reviews, signifying "universal acclaim".

=== Accolades ===
| Year | Award | Category | Nominee(s) | Result | Ref. |
|---|---|---|---|---|---|
| 2020 | Annie Awards | Outstanding Achievement for Editorial in an Animated Television/Broadcast Production | "Mouse" | Nominated | |
| 2020 | Daytime Creative Arts Emmy Awards | Outstanding Writing for an Animated Program | Jared Stern, Mark Rizzo, Vanessa McGee, John Whittington | Nominated | |
| 2020 | Daytime Creative Arts Emmy Awards | Outstanding Main Title for an Animated Program | Cody Cameron, Helen Kalafatic, Timothy Yoo, Eusong Lee, Jasmin Lai, Stéphane Coëdel, Tor Aunet, Linda Fong, Elaine Lee, Sylvia Liu, Eastwood Wong, Nelson Boles, Thea Glad, Gervais Merryweather, Tommy Rodricks, Natan Moura, Sarah Kambara, Myles Shioda and Kevin Dart | Nominated | |
| 2020 | Daytime Creative Arts Emmy Awards | Outstanding Casting for an Animated Series or Special | Mary Hidalgo | Won | |
| 2020 | Producers Guild of America Awards | Outstanding Children's Program | Green Eggs and Ham | Nominated | |
| 2022 | Children's & Family Emmy Awards | Outstanding Main Title and Graphics | Helen Kalafatic, Jared Stern, Kevin Dart, Chloe Hsu, Xanthe Bouma, Efrain Farias, Monica Grue, Jasmin Lai, Elaine Lee, Keiko Murayama, Claire Nero, Jojo Park, Junyi Wu, Lauren Zurcher, Maria Torregrosa Domenech, Matt Herring, Tommy Rodricks, Jong-Ha Yoon, Alasdair Brotherston, Stéphane Coëdel, Simone Ghilardotti, Natan Moura, Andrew Wilson, Hugo Morales, Bryan Wolfson, Sarah Kambara and Myles Shioda | Nominated | |
| 2023 | Annie Awards | Outstanding Achievement for Editorial in an Animated Television/Broadcast Production | "The Sam Who Came in From the Cold" | Nominated | |
| 2023 | Producers Guild of America Awards | Outstanding Children's Program | Green Eggs and Ham | Nominated | |

== Home media ==
Season 1 was released on Digital on November 22, 2020 and on DVD on December 1, 2020, by Warner Bros. Home Entertainment.

Season 2 (The Second Serving) was released on Digital on June 26, 2023 by Warner Bros. Home Entertainment.
