= Chainsaw Warrior =

1987 single-player board game

- Designers: Stephen Hand
- Publishers: Games Workshop
- Players: 1
- Setup time: 5 minutes
- Playing time: 1 to 2 hours
- Chance: High

Chainsaw Warrior is a single-player board game designed by Stephen Hand and published by Games Workshop in 1987. A video game based on the board game was released for mobile and desktop platforms.

== Board game ==
The player has sixty minutes to navigate a labyrinth composed of an abandoned urban slum in New York, represented by two decks of cards, locate the entity Darkness attempting to destroy the city and kill it. The slum contains hazards, zombies, mutants and other creatures affected by Darkness, who will attempt to kill the player or slow him down. Failure to kill Darkness, either by running out of time, dying of injuries, or succumbing to zombie venom/radiation poisoning, results in a loss for the player.

The player has several attributes randomised by die roll at the start of the game, which affect hand-to-hand combat, marksmanship, ability to take damage and reaction time. There are also separate tracks to record the effects of zombie venom and radiation damage.

At the start of the game, the player is equipped with a random assortment of weapons and items (which can include the eponymous chainsaw) and a critical item called the Laser Lance, which is the only weapon capable of destroying Darkness. Loss of the Laser Lance or running out of its ammunition requires the player to leave the slums for a replacement, suffering a time penalty.

White Dwarf published a number of variant rules (such as being able to gain additional equipment before entering the slums in return for an expenditure of time) and additional weapon and equipment cards.

The gameplay is a stylised version of solitaire in that the deck of cards is randomised, but certain items of equipment are required to defeat creatures found later in the game.

An online version of the game was coded and designed by Peter Duncanson in 1999. In May 2008, Games Workshop announced it was no longer supporting the site, and it was closed.

== Reception ==
Jervis Johnson reviewed Chainsaw Warrior for White Dwarf #88, and stated that "Ultimately, Chainsaw Warrior is an easy game to play – and a difficult game to win. Above all, it's a lot of fun!"

W. Peter Miller reviewed Chainsaw Warrior for Different Worlds magazine and stated that "If you can win this game without cheating you are doing well. Games Workshop recommends this game for ages 14 and over. This is due to the violent nature of the game more than any inherent complexity or difficulty. Chainsaw Warrior is heartily recommended to anyone looking for a fun, challenging bit of solo gaming."

In 2013, while reviewing the video game adaptation, Matt Thrower of Gamezebo remarked on the board game: "The original was cumbersome and time-consuming to set up and play, and gave you relatively little reward for all that effort. Mechanically, it communicated little sense of its action-packed premise and had virtually no strategy or decision-making, with almost everything being resolved by a dice roll."

== Video game adaptations ==
On 22 July 2013, developer Auroch Digital (who had created Endgame:Syria and NarcoGuerra) announced that they were creating a new version of the game for mobile and desktop: "The seminal hit board game Chainsaw Warrior, made by Games Workshop back in 1987, is set to return this year in a digital form. The original 80s game was a notable rarity in that it was a solo board game that pitted the player not against others but against the clock. ... The game is due to release on iPad, iPhone and Android at the end of summer at a price point and date to be announced soon." The announcement received widespread coverage by the gaming and hobby press. The game port is being produced by the same designer as Call of Cthulhu: The Wasted Land, another 1980s game that was converted to a digital format.

The iPhone, iPad and iPod Touch versions of the game were released on 23 September 2013. 148apps described it as "a brutally awesome good time". Gamercast wrote it was an accurate adaptation of the original, saying it has "everything you want in a digitised version of the Games Workshop classic". Matt Thrower of Gamezebo said: "And yet, for all the obvious deficiencies on display, both as an app and as a game, I couldn’t help but to have a good time."

A PC port of the digital version was released on Valve's Steam service on 7 October 2013. In November 2014, the developer of the mobile and PC version, Auroch Digital, announced a follow-up title, Chainsaw Warrior: Lords of the Night, released in early 2015. The sequel introduced a new Mayan theme, with a number of new enemies and gameplay options, including temples that contain guardians, special boss-level enemy types. By beating these guardians, the player is granted bonuses, known in-game as blessings. The game was launched on to Steam on the 17 February. It was then launched to mobile devices on the 17 April 2015.
