= Auroch Digital =

British game development company

- Type: Subsidiary
- Industry: Video games
- Founded: 2010
- Headquarters: Bristol, England
- Number of employees: 61 (2021)
- Parent: Roundtable Interactive (2025-present)
- Website: www.aurochdigital.com

Auroch Digital is a British video game developer based in Bristol, England. It previously ran the GameTheNews initiative, a project that produced new games on a variety of topics, for which it was included in the 2014 Nominet 100 list of companies doing social good with technology. In September 2021, Auroch Digital was acquired by Sumo Group for $8.3 million, and was later sold to Roundtable Interactive in November 2025.

== Overview ==
The company makes video games and tabletop games, with its main focus on strategy and management titles, and adaptations of board games into digital games, having worked with companies such as Games Workshop, Steve Jackson Games, and Modiphius Entertainment.

On 1 June 2022, it was announced a first person shooter based on the Warhammer 40K franchise was in development titled Warhammer 40,000: Boltgun and to be published by Focus Entertainment.

== Games developed/published ==
Title	Year	Platform(s)
Endgame: Syria	2012	Android, iOS, Microsoft Windows, OS X
NarcoGuerra	2013	Android, iOS, Microsoft Windows, OS X
Chainsaw Warrior	2013	Android, iOS, Microsoft Windows, OS X, Linux
Chainsaw Warrior: Lords of the Night	2015	Android, iOS, Microsoft Windows, OS X, Linux
Last Days of Old Earth	2016	Microsoft Windows
Ogre	2017	Microsoft Windows, OS X
Achtung! Cthulhu Tactics	2018	Microsoft Windows, PlayStation 4, Xbox One, Nintendo Switch
Dark Future: Blood Red States	2019	Microsoft Windows
Mars Horizon	2020	Microsoft Windows, PlayStation 4, Xbox One, Nintendo Switch
Wildermyth	2021	PlayStation 4, PlayStation 5, Xbox One, Xbox Series X/S, Nintendo Switch
Brewmaster: Beer Brewing Simulator	2022	Microsoft Windows, PlayStation 4, PlayStation 5, Xbox One, Xbox Series X/S, Nintendo Switch
Warhammer 40,000: Boltgun	2023	Microsoft Windows, PlayStation 4, PlayStation 5, Xbox One, Xbox Series X/S, Nintendo Switch
Starship Troopers: Ultimate Bug War!	2026	Microsoft Windows, PlayStation 5, Xbox Series X/S, Nintendo Switch 2
Warhammer 40,000: Boltgun 2	2026	Microsoft Windows, PlayStation 5, Xbox Series X/S
Warhammer Survivors	2026	Android, iOS, Microsoft Windows, PlayStation 5, Xbox Series X/S, Nintendo Switch, Nintendo Switch 2
Mars Horizon 2: The Search for Life	TBA	Microsoft Windows
