= The Watch (film) =

2012 film by Akiva Schaffer

- Theatrical release poster
- Directed by: Akiva Schaffer
- Written by: Jared Stern; Seth Rogen; Evan Goldberg
- Produced by: Shawn Levy
- Starring: Ben Stiller; Vince Vaughn; Jonah Hill; Richard Ayoade; Rosemarie DeWitt
- Cinematography: Barry Peterson
- Edited by: Dean Zimmerman
- Music by: Christophe Beck
- Production companies: 20th Century Fox; 21 Laps Entertainment; Dune Entertainment; Ingenious Media; Down Productions; Big Screen Productions
- Distributed by: 20th Century Fox
- Release dates: July 27, 2012 (United States); August 31, 2012 (United Kingdom)
- Running time: 102 minutes
- Country: United States
- Language: English
- Budget: $68 million
- Box office: $68.3 million

The Watch (previously known as Neighborhood Watch) is a 2012 American science fiction comedy film directed by Akiva Schaffer and written by Jared Stern, Seth Rogen, and Evan Goldberg. It stars Ben Stiller, Vince Vaughn, Jonah Hill, and Richard Ayoade as a group of neighbors who form a suburban neighborhood watch group, where they uncover an extraterrestrial discovery. Rosemarie DeWitt is also among the cast. This was the final film role of R. Lee Ermey, who died on April 15, 2018.

The film began its development in early 2008 under producer Shawn Levy as a teen-targeted project written by Stern. Between mid 2009 and late 2010, it saw different directors and stars join the project until November 2010 when it moved in a new direction under Rogen and Goldberg (who rewrote the script for an adult audience). Filming began in October 2011 in the state of Georgia, concluding in January 2012.

The film's marketing campaign was affected by the February 2012 shooting of Trayvon Martin by a neighborhood watch member. As a result, the campaign was refocused on the alien premise instead of the film leads and the film's title was changed from Neighborhood Watch to The Watch. Released by 20th Century Fox on July 27, 2012 in the United States, and on August 31, 2012 in the United Kingdom, the film was a box-office bomb, grossing just $68.3 million on a $68 million budget. The film was also met with generally negative reviews, with critics focusing on the plotting, frequent "vulgar and offensive" jokes and numerous product placements. However, Hill and Ayoade's performances were more positively received and so has the film in general in recent years.

== Plot ==
In the fictional town of Glenview, Ohio, Evan Trautwig is a passionate volunteer in the community and senior manager of the local Costco. His life is changed when the store's night security guard is murdered. The local police have no leads and show no interest in investigating further. Determined to find the killer and bring him to justice, Evan decides to form a neighborhood watch. However, he only manages to recruit Bob, a construction manager and overprotective father; Franklin, a high school dropout who dreams of being a police officer but failed all the tests; and Jamarcus, a recent divorcé.

The watch members use the group as an excuse to drink and relax, much to Evan's chagrin. While driving on patrol, they accidentally hit something. They discover a strange metallic orb that acts as a highly destructive weapon and deduce that it is of alien origin. Meanwhile, several more townspeople are mysteriously killed. The watch responds to the murders and encounters an alien, which attacks them. Evan seemingly kills it with a lawn gnome before the group returns with the creature to Bob's house. The creature regains consciousness and escapes, stealing the metallic orb and warning them that the aliens have already infiltrated the town. The watch members theorize that the aliens are stealing their victim's skins and disguising themselves as human. Bob confides to Evan that he is worried about his daughter Chelsea and does not trust her boyfriend Jason. Evan admits that he has been avoiding his wife Abby because he is infertile, and reveals his worry that it may cause her to leave him.

Evan suspects that one of his neighbors is an alien due to his deadpan, cryptic way of speaking and because he always seems to be following Evan. As the watch scouts the neighbor's house, Bob learns that Chelsea is at an unsupervised party with Jason. Bob disobeys Evan's orders and rushes to the party with Franklin. Bob prevents Jason from raping Chelsea, but Jason beats him until Franklin intervenes. Evan and Jamarcus investigate the odd neighbor alone, discovering that he hosts orgies in his basement. When Bob returns, he and Evan argue over his putting his daughter above the watch. Bob is fired from the watch after saying Evan has no friends because he tries to control everything. Evan goes home and admits his infertility to Abby, who accepts the news and tells him they will work things out.

Evan then receives an urgent visit from Jamarcus, who confesses that he is one of the aliens but has chosen to side with humanity after attending the orgy and experiencing human culture. He warns the group that the aliens are building a transmitter beneath the Costco store which will summon their armada to destroy the earth; he is expelled from the watch for his deception.

They go to Franklin's house to get some guns and after arming themselves, they infiltrate Costco to destroy the transmitter. Bob encounters Jason who reveals that he is also an alien, and they brawl. Evan and Franklin attempt to disable the transmitter, but are surrounded by aliens. Jamarcus arrives and saves the pair, revealing that the aliens' brains are located in their crotch; Bob kills Jason by ripping off his penis. Evan discovers that the transmitter is powered by the metallic orb and removes it, disabling the machine. More aliens arrive, forcing the group to flee. The watch uses the metallic orb to destroy the Costco building, killing all of the aliens inside.

In the epilogue, Evan and Abby rekindle their romance and adopt a daughter. Bob grows closer to Chelsea and likes her new boyfriend. Franklin is finally accepted by the Glenview Police Department, and Jamarcus continues participating in the secret neighborhood orgies. The group maintains the watch, continuing to protect Glenview.

== Cast ==
- Ben Stiller as Evan Trautwig, a Costco manager and suburban resident who forms a neighborhood watch after his friend is murdered; he keeps forming new groups because he has no friends.
- Vince Vaughn as Bob McAllister, a resident an enthusiastic and friendly who uses the watch to spy on his teenage daughter
- Jonah Hill as Franklin Fawcett, a resident with emotional problems who joins the watch after being rejected by the local police force
- Richard Ayoade as Jamarcus Perkins, a eccentric and recently divorced British resident
- Rosemarie DeWitt as Abby Trautwig, Evan's wife
- Patricia French as Brenda Fawcett, Franklin's mother

Vaughn began negotiations to star as Bob McAllister in June 2011, the character's relationship with his daughter being what convinced Vaughn to take the role. Hill's involvement was confirmed in August 2011, and his prior commitment to The Watch forced him to decline a role in Quentin Tarantino's Django Unchained. He had considered the Django role as "the perfect next step" following his 2011 Academy Award nomination; however, he later secured a role in the film. Hill spent two weeks learning to use a butterfly knife for his part. Chris Tucker was considered for the role of Jamarcus Perkins, before Ayoade was signed.

The cast also includes Erin Moriarty (as Chelsea McAllister, Bob's daughter), Nicholas Braun (as Jason, Chelsea's boyfriend), Will Forte (as Sergeant Bressman), Mel Rodriguez (as his partner Chucho), Doug Jones (as the chief alien villain), R. Lee Ermey (his final film role before he died on April 15, 2018) as Manfred Salisbury (a local resident) and Joe Nunez as Antonio Guzman (Evan's colleague, whose murder inspires him to start the neighborhood watch). Billy Crudup appears (uncredited) as Evan's "creepy neighbor", Paul. Director Akiva Schaffer and his collaborators in the comedy troupe The Lonely Island, Andy Samberg and Jorma Taccone, make cameo appearances in the film as masturbating participants in Paul's orgy.

== Production ==
=== Development ===
The film began its development as Neighborhood Watch in early 2008, with producer Shawn Levy developing the project over three years, inspired by an idea by 20th Century Fox executive John Fox. Levy described his original vision as a "PG-13 kind of Ghostbusters-y thing." The original screenplay was written by Jared Stern. In May 2009, David Dobkin and Will Ferrell were negotiating to direct and star, respectively (with Dobkin's involvement progressing to revising Stern's script). However, by August, Dobkin and Ferrell had left the project.

In December 2009, Peter Segal was in negotiations to direct the film, but by November 2010, the project had not named a director. Also in November, Seth Rogen and Evan Goldberg were brought onto the project to rewrite the script as an adult-oriented, R-rated film. By June 2011, Akiva Schaffer was given the option to direct his second feature film (following the 2007 comedy Hot Rod). On May 4, 2012 (two months before the film's release), it was renamed The Watch.

=== Filming ===
Original alien-themed, bullet-ridden poster with modified neighborhood watch sign, replaced when Fox sought to distance the premise from the Trayvon Martin case

Principal photography began in October 2011 in Georgia, with filming occurring in Atlanta (including Inman Park) and several areas in Cobb County (including the Oakleigh, Echo Mill, and Amberton subdivisions in the city of Powder Springs). Filming also took place at Marietta Square in the city of Marietta, where businesses were renamed and an alley behind Hemingway's Bar & Grill was treated to artificially age the buildings. One of the Marietta scenes filmed involved a young boy on a skateboard being abducted by aliens. Scenes were also filmed in the Brookhaven community. On October 25, 2011, a casting call was made for extras to fill the football stadium during two nights of filming on November 2–3 at Campbell High School in Smyrna, Georgia. On November 23, 2011, a minor, walk-on role in the film was auctioned to benefit the Stiller Foundation; the role was sold for $23,000 to an undisclosed bidder.

In late November 2011, the site of a former BJ's Wholesale Club in what is now Peachtree Corners, Georgia was converted in appearance to a Costco for shooting. On January 23, 2012, Hill announced that filming had concluded. Multiple scene takes were made, allowing the cast to follow the script as written and inject their own improvisations. Special effects company Legacy Effects provided creature designs and effects for the aliens. The alien costume featured an animatronic head, remotely controlled by three people. The suit was hot even in cold areas, and had to be unzipped to let Doug Jones cool off between takes. The costume was enhanced with CGI in a number of ways, including replacing arms and dilating pupils (which Schaffer thought made the creature seem more alive).

=== Marketing ===
The Neighborhood Watch marketing campaign began on February 29, 2012, with the release of a teaser poster, trailer and the unveiling of the film's website, jointhewatch.com. The film's trailer was nominated for a Golden Trailer award, recognizing achievements in marketing. On March 27, 2012, it was reported that 20th Century Fox had the poster and trailer removed from Florida theaters in response to increasing controversy surrounding the February shooting death of Trayvon Martin in Sanford, Florida by neighborhood watch captain George Zimmerman. The trailer featured Hill imitating a gun with his hand pretending to shoot at teenagers, while the poster featured a bullet-ridden, alien-themed neighborhood watch sign. According to insiders 20th Century Fox intended to move into the next phase of the marketing campaign as soon as possible (focusing on the film's science-fiction aspects), while replacing previous posters with images of the cast. 20th Century Fox maintained that the July 27, 2012, release date would remain unchanged by the Martin case or the marketing changes.

In a statement about the changes 20th Century Fox said, "We are very sensitive to the Trayvon Martin case, but our film is a broad alien-invasion comedy and bears absolutely no relation to the tragic events in Florida...these initial marketing materials were released before this incident ever came to light. The teaser materials were part of an early phase of our marketing and were never planned for long-term use." The alien-focused campaign began on May 4, 2012, with the release of a new trailer, coinciding with 20th Century Fox's changing the film's title to The Watch to further distance the film from the Martin case.

== Release ==
The premiere of The Watch took place on July 23, 2012, at Grauman's Chinese Theatre in Hollywood. It was released in North America on July 27, 2012. On July 25, Harkins Theatres (the sixth-largest North American cinema chain) announced it would not be showing the film after failing to reach a financial agreement with 20th Century Fox.

=== Box office ===
The Watch has grossed $35,353,000 in North America and $32,914,862 in other territories for a worldwide total of $68,267,862 against a budget of $68 million. In the week before release, pre-release tracking showed that up to 25% of North American audiences were reluctant to visit cinemas following the mass shooting in a Colorado cinema the previous week. This, plus competition from the simultaneous launch of the 2012 Summer Olympics, would negatively impact ticket sales for The Watch. Tracking showed that the film could earn $13–15 million during its opening weekend.

The film earned an estimated $4.5 million on its opening day. During its opening weekend it earned $12.7 million from 3,168 theaters – an average of $4,025 per theater – ranking third behind Ice Age: Continental Drift ($13.3 million) and The Dark Knight Rises ($62.1 million). The largest segments of the opening-weekend audience were over age 25 (59%) and male (60%). The film left theaters on October 18, 2012 (after 12 weeks) with a total gross of $35.3 million.

Outside North America, the film had its most successful opening weekends in the United Kingdom ($3.5 million), Australia ($1.8 million) and Russia ($1.3 million). These countries also represented its largest total grosses, with $6 million from the United Kingdom, $5.9 million from Australia and $3.2 million from Russia.

=== Critical response ===
On Rotten Tomatoes, The Watch has an approval percentage of 16% based on 167 reviews and a rating of 4.10 out of 10. The critics consensus reads: "The Watch uneasily mixes sci-fi elements with gross-out gags and strands its talented cast with a script that favors vulgarity over wit at nearly every turn." On Metacritic, the film has a score of 36 out of 100 based on 35 critic reviews, meaning "generally unfavorable reviews". Audiences polled by CinemaScore gave the film an average grade of "C+" on an A+ to F scale.

The Hollywood Reporter's Sheri Linden described the film as feeling like "part three of a past-its-prime franchise", criticizing the plot as moving "lazily from setup to punchline to setup, with no particular point and almost no punch". Roger Ebert awarded the film 2 out of 4 stars, stating that the film "has lots of energy but not much inspiration". Ebert commented that the comic timing of the lead actors benefits the dialog, but frequent instances of "crude, vulgar and offensive" comedy became unwelcome and unamusing. Rolling Stone's Peter Travers awarded the film 1.5 out of 4 stars, stating that it should have been a "Ghostbusters lite" and "should be crazy, stupid fun but settles for just stupid." He was also critical of the use of Costco in the plot, which he considered product placement. However, he praised Hill's "scene-stealing" performance.

Entertainment Weekly's Lisa Schwarzbaum commented that the film struggles to find a "coherent" style between the "PG-13 rated aliens" and adult themes and dialogue. The A.V. Club's Keith Phipps also unfavorably compared the film to Ghostbusters, stating that it struggles to replicate that film's successful formula but fails to innovate with the story or characters. He also criticized the frequent Costco promotion. Phipps praised Ayoade: "...he lends an unpredictable element to the group dynamic, and to the film. It’s the sort of performance that ought to be plucked for use in another, better movie." Variety's Justin Chang complimented the interaction between the four leads, but criticized the film for relegating Latino characters to murder victims and female characters "to be protected or consoled". He described the film as a "lowbrow, lame-brained mash-up of buddies-on-patrol comedy and sci-fi actioner, held together (barely) by an endless string of penis jokes". Chang praised Ayoade's "mellow, nerdy-funky appeal [that represents] one of the [film's] few novel aspects".

The Los Angeles Times' Betsy Sharkey was more positive, stating that "the funniest stuff comes from the kind of situational misfires that can happen when dudes try to do things, like catch aliens, that they are clearly not cut out to do". She considered that Schaffer's previous experience directing short comic videos for Saturday Night Live was partially responsible for individual comic moments broken up by transitions where "things tend to fall apart". Screencrush's Matt Singer was positive, calling the film funny and praising the improvisational feel of the scenes and "ingenious" set-pieces, but was critical of the promotion of Costco and Costco products throughout. Boxoffice's James Rocchi offered a positive stance, stating that the "plot moves, the supporting cast is lively and the action stays small-scale and intimate, never overwhelming the laughs"; he felt that the profanity and vulgarity never became "stale". Rocchi concluded that the film was forgettable and "disposable".

=== Accolades ===
Staff members Alyssa Weisberg (casting director), Shay Griffin (location casting), Yesi Ramirez (associate) and Karina Walters (associate) from this movie were nominated at the Artios Awards for Outstanding Achievement in Casting - Big Budget Feature - Comedy. The movies trailer by Twentieth Century Fox and Creative Workshop was nominated for a Golden Trailer Award for Best Music.

=== Home media ===
The Watch was released on DVD, Blu-ray disc and digital download on November 13, 2012, by 20th Century Fox Home Entertainment. The DVD version contains deleted scenes, a gag reel, the theatrical trailer and feature videos "Alien Invasions & You" and "Casting the Alien". The Blu-ray disc contains the DVD content, a digital copy of the film and two additional features: "Jonah Alternate Takes" and "Watchmakers."
