= Jared Stern =

American screenwriter, director and producer

- Occupations: Screenwriter; Film producer; Television writer; Television producer; Film director
- Years active: 2011–present
- Notable work: The Lego Batman Movie; The Lego Ninjago Movie; Green Eggs and Ham; DC League of Super-Pets

Jared Stern is an American screenwriter, director and producer. He collaborated with John Whittington on The Lego Batman Movie (2017), The Lego Ninjago Movie (2017), and DC League of Super-Pets (2022), the latter of which he also directed.

== Career ==
Stern began his career by writing the screenplay for Mr. Popper's Penguins (2011). In 2012, he wrote the comedy film The Watch. The following year, he wrote the comedy film The Internship. In 2014, Stern was hired to write The Lego Movie 2: The Second Part (2019), but eventually moved on to writing the spinoffs The Lego Batman Movie and The Lego Ninjago Movie (both 2017). In the same year, he wrote a script based on the Disney theme park attraction It's a Small World. In 2015, he wrote and created the television series Dr. Ken. In 2017, he produced the live action film It Happened in L.A. (2017).

After writing screenplays, Stern directed his feature film debut, Happy Anniversary (2018), a Netflix film. He also served as an executive producer on Storks (2016) and Smallfoot (2018). In 2019, he created the animated series Green Eggs and Ham, based on the Dr. Seuss book of the same name. In 2018, Stern was announced as an executive producer on the Warner Animation Group film Toto. He gained notability from directing the DC Comics film DC League of Super-Pets (2022). He teamed up with Robert Zemeckis to write the HBO Max streaming series Tooned Out. In 2024, Stern was set to produce an animated adaptation of The Cat in the Hat (2026). In 2026, it was announced that Stern would co-direct an animated follow-up to Charlie and the Chocolate Factory titled Charlie vs. the Chocolate Factory (2027) for Netflix.

== Filmography ==
=== Feature films ===
Year	Title	Director	Writer	Producer
2011	Mr. Popper's Penguins	No	Yes	No
2012	The Watch	No	Yes	No
2013	The Internship	No	Yes	No
2017	The Lego Batman Movie	No	Yes	No
2017	The Lego Ninjago Movie	No	Yes	No
2018	Happy Anniversary	Yes	Yes	Executive
2022	DC League of Super-Pets	Yes	Yes	Yes
2027	Charlie vs. the Chocolate Factory	Yes	No	No

Producer only

- Storks (2016, executive)
- It Happened in L.A. (2017)
- Smallfoot (2018, executive)
- The Cat in the Hat (2026)

Creative consultant

- The Lego Batman Movie (2017)
- The Lego Ninjago Movie (2017)
- The Lego Movie 2: The Second Part (2019)

=== Television ===
Year	Title	Creator	Writer	Executive Producer
2015–2017	Dr. Ken	Yes	Yes	Yes
2019–2022	Green Eggs and Ham	Developer	Yes	Yes

== Accolades ==
For his work on Green Eggs and Ham, he was nominated at the 47th Daytime Creative Arts Emmy Awards for "Outstanding Writing for an Animated Program".
