= Mars Horizon =

2020 video game

- Developer: Auroch Digital
- Release: 2020
- Genre: Construction and management simulation

Mars Horizon is a 2020 video game by Auroch Digital about the Space Race and exploration of space in general, including the proposed first crewed mission to Mars.

== Gameplay ==
The player first selects a space agency: NASA, ESA, Soviet Union (later Russia), China, and Japan. Public support determines the agency's budget, and a tech tree unlocks missions, buildings, and rocket parts. The missions are milestones from the space race, such as launching the first satellite, the first human to outer space, the first probes to the various planets in the Solar System, the Moon landing, and so on. During these missions the player must complete minigames to progress the mission. While these mini-games occur, the player is given quotas they must fulfill by trading resources (such as navigation, communications, power, and data) for others, facing increasingly difficult quotas with more factors used for trading resources to the mini-games added the further the player progresses, including radiation, heat, and drift. If these quotas aren't met the mission will fail. The later stages of the game focus on proposed missions that have not been achieved yet, such as the first sample-return mission from Mars. The game ends with the first human mission to Mars, with the agency that completes this first automatically winning.

== Creation ==
Mars Horizon is the result of a cooperation between Auroch Digital and the European Space Agency and the UK Space Agency. The development team stayed in facilities in Germany and the Netherlands, receiving firsthand experience on the development of space programs, specifically the ongoing projects to reach Mars. The interviews included staff from the ExoMars mission. Staff members from ESA provided in turn technical assistance, gameplay advice, and testing.

== Reception ==
Reception

Aggregate scores
Aggregator	Score
Metacritic	(PC) 71/100 (XONE) 72/100
OpenCritic	67% recommend

Mars Horizon received mixed reviews on Metacritic. Fellow review aggregator OpenCritic assessed that the game received fair approval, being recommended by 67% of critics. Joe Robinson from PCGamesN praised the success in capturing the wonder of space exploration with a strict hard science fiction approach, which he only saw at Kerbal Space Program (KSP). He pointed that the main difference was that in KSP the player flies the ships himself, while in Mars Horizon the game just jumps between screens, menus, and cutscene videos. Elizabeth Howell from Space.com praised the presence of an aerospace engineering technology tree. She also considered that the game does a good job of adapting the history of space exploration, although it fails to make it clear that only the United States and Russia were significant researchers of it during its early days. She also considers that the gameplay makes the player face the hardships that real space agencies must face, such as the risk of expensive ships being damaged by unforeseen issues.

== Sequel ==
Auroch Digital announced a sequel titled Mars Horizon 2: The Search for Life, that would have been released in 2024. It would feature different space agencies that would be either rivals or allies, and the focus would be on the search for extraterrestrial life. Planetary scientist Konstantin Batygin joined the design team to provide feedback on the details of the real-life search for life on Mars, to ensure that the game stays as accurate as possible. The development of the sequel was halted in January 2026, as a result of the poor reception of the demo and surveys.
