= Warhammer 40,000: Boltgun 2 =

2026 video game

- Developer: Auroch Digital
- Publisher: Big Fan Games
- Composers: Matthew Walker; Mick Gordon
- Series: Warhammer 40,000
- Engine: Unreal Engine 5
- Platforms: PlayStation 5; Windows; Xbox Series X/S; Nintendo Switch 2
- Release: Windows, PS5, Xbox Series X/S; 14 October 2026; Nintendo Switch 2; 19 November 2026
- Genre: First-person shooter
- Mode: Single-player

Warhammer 40,000: Boltgun 2 (Note: Stylized as Warhammer 40,000: Boltgun II) is a 2026 first-person shooter video game developed by Auroch Digital and published by Big Fan Games, a label of Devolver Digital. It is set in the Warhammer 40,000 universe and is a direct sequel to Warhammer 40,000: Boltgun. It was announced in May 2025 and was released for PlayStation 5, Windows and Xbox Series X/S on 14 October 2026, and for Nintendo Switch 2 on 19 November 2026.

== Gameplay ==
Warhammer 40,000: Boltgun 2 is a single-player first-person shooter with similar graphics and gameplay mechanics as the first Boltgun. The game features two playable characters: the Space Marine Malum Caedo, a Sternguard Veteran from the Ultramarines 1st Company (returning from the previous game), and the Battle Sister Nyra Veyrath, a veteran Celestian of the Order of Our Martyred Lady.

== Plot ==
Vashtorr the Arkifane, a powerful Chaos Daemon king specializing in technology, activates a Daemon Engine on the world of Akrimonious Prime that wipes out the Imperial fleet stationed there. The player (as either Malum or Nyra) escapes aboard an Imperial Navy cruiser to purge the nearby worlds and halt Vashtorr's plans. Aided by the Death Korps of Krieg regiments of the Imperial Guard, they first confront Chaos forces on Novoza before they defeat a Daemon Engine of Khorne called a Lord of Skulls. After surviving an ambush by Vashtorr's Ark of Omen, they travel to Amara Mors, eventually battling a Keeper of Secrets, a Greater Daemon of Slaanesh. They then confront Vashtorr himself aboard his Ark, but he escapes via a Warp portal. After purging the world of Erythine or its moon of Trephine, the player returns to Akrimonious Prime and battles the Arkifane again, this time banishing him to the Warp and destroying the Daemon Engine, and with it part of the planet itself. As the Imperial forces commence their cleanup, the player emerges from the rubble, bloodied but unbowed.

== Development ==
Warhammer 40,000: Boltgun 2 was announced on 22 May 2025 by Big Fan Games, and is scheduled to be released on 14 October 2026 for Windows, PlayStation 5, and Xbox Series X and S. A version for Nintendo Switch 2 will release on 19 November 2026. The soundtrack was produced by Matthew Walker, with Mick Gordon contributing an original song "Ascent of the Arkifane".

== Reception ==
Reception

Aggregate scores
Aggregator	Score
Metacritic	(PC) 81/100 (PS5) 78/100
OpenCritic	81% recommend (Note: Based on 27 reviews.)

The game received "generally favorable" reviews according to review aggregator Metacritic.
