= Brewmaster: Beer Brewing Simulator =

2022 video game

- Developer: Auroch Digital
- Publisher: Fireshine Games
- Engine: Unreal Engine 4
- Platforms: Windows; Nintendo Switch; PlayStation 4; PlayStation 5; Xbox One; Xbox Series X/S
- Release: Windows; WW: September 29, 2022; Consoles; WW: October 27, 2022
- Genre: Simulation
- Mode: Single-player

Brewmaster: Beer Brewing Simulator is a 2022 simulation video game developed by Auroch Digital and published by Fireshine Games.

== Gameplay ==
Players brew their own beer in a realistic simulation. Brewmaster is played first-person and has two modes: a sandbox mode in which there are no goals or restrictions, and a story mode in which players progress through scripted challenges. Each step of the brewing process is simulated, and players are guided through it by a friend, who leaves them notes on the proper techniques. There are no failure states.

== Development ==
Auroch Digital, a British independent video game developer, focused on making a realistic simulation. To do this, the development team spent time researching brewing and became certified brewers. They said learning about and joining the beer brewing community helped them avoid incorrect assumptions about their target demographic. When players complained about some of the uncompromising realism, Auroch compromised by making the simulation obey the laws of physics while speeding up some aspects of gameplay. Fireshine Games released Brewmaster for Windows on September 29, 2022. The PlayStation 4 and 5, Xbox One and Series X/S, and Switch versions were released on October 27, 2022.

== Reception ==
Reviews praised the simulation aspects, though PC Gamer found it frustrating to not be able to taste the beer itself. Push Square gave it 7 out of 10 stars for its laid back and enjoyable gameplay. GameStar praised the game's attention to detail and relaxing atmosphere. Push Square and GameStar both enjoyed the educational quality.
